= Harry B. Combs =

American aviation pioneer (1913–2003)

- Born: Harry Benjamin Combs; January 27, 1913; Denver, Colorado, U.S.
- Died: December 23, 2003 (aged 90); New York City, New York, U.S.
- Education: Yale University; Taft School; Fessenden School
- Occupations: pilot, aviation executive, author
- Employer(s): Gates Learjet Corporation; Combs Aviation Corp. Mountain States Aviation

Harry Benjamin Combs (27 January 1913 – 23 December 2003) was an American aviation pioneer, airplane manufacturer, and author. He was founder of Combs Aviation and president of Gates Learjet Corporation.

He was a pioneering soaring pilot who "lived and breathed the Golden and Jet Ages of aviation." He was inducted into the National Aviation Hall of Fame in 1996.

== Early life ==
Combs was from Denver, Colorado. His father was Albert Henry Combs, a pilot with the Royal Flying Corps in Canada.

Combs saw his first airplane in 1917 at the age of four when he traveled with his grandmother from Denver to a Royal Flying Corps training field in Deseronto, Canada where his father was training. Combs' father was shot down twice while in aviation combat in World War I, and was said to have warned his son never to set foot in an airplane.

From 1920 to 1926, Combs attended Fessenden School, a preparatory boarding school in Massachusetts. While at school, he read Diary of an Unknown Aviator, World War I chronicle by Elliot White Springs. Combs was inspired by Springs and wanted to fly an airplane, despite his father's warning. While on summer vacation in Denver in 1926, Combs and a friend paid $4 for a ride in a mail plane.

In 1927, Combs enrolled in the Taft School in Connecticut for five years. That was the same year, Charles Lindbergh made his historic crossing of the Atlantic. When Combs saw a magazine advertisement for $99 flying lessons taught by Lindbergh's old company, he made his way to St. Louis for three hours of flight instruction.

In 1929, after thirty hours of flying, the sixteen–year–old Combs designed and built a sport biplane named Vamp Bat. However, the Vamp Bat was short-lived, and crashed after a flight in Pueblo, Colorado. Combs said, “You didn't have any means of controlling it when the wind was blowing. There were no brakes—just a tailskid. If you sped up, it got away from you and you turned upside down. I was hanging upside down inches from the ground. It busted up. I should have known that when you don't have brakes you have to stay on the grass.”

Starting in 1931, he attended Yale University's Sheffield Scientific School, graduating in 1935 with a degree in applied economics. While at Yale, he lettered in track and football and was a member and president of St. Anthony Hall. He was also chairman of Cannon & Castle Military Society and a member of the Torch Honor Society.

He then attended reserve officer's training, where he was commissioned as a ROTC second lieutenant in the U.S. Army Corps of Engineers. However, he did not go on to cadet training because he had fallen in love—and cadets were not allowed to get married.

== Career ==
=== Aviation ===
In 1935, Combs worked as a ticket agent for Pan American Airways but quit after two years because he wanted to fly. Then, he ran a small flying service in Armonk, New York. Next, he worked in investment banking with Bosworth, Chanute, Loughridge & Co. in Denver. Wanting to return to airplanes, he was enlisted as a second lieutenant pilot officer in the Colorado National Guard 120th Observation Squadron, logging enough flying time to earn an instructor's rating. Now able to teach, he was hired by the Ray Wilson Flight School in Denver as an instructor.

In 1938, he co-founded Mountain States Aviation in Denver, a flying school and airplane sales company. In 1939, he started Combs Aircraft Corp. to design and build an experimental aircraft known as the Combscraft; however, the airplane could not pass a spin test and the project was abandoned.

During World War II, Mountain States Aviation trained more than 9,000 pilots on bombers, fighter planes, freight planes, and gliders with 45 planes, 45 flight instructors, and 160 employees. In 1944, he enlisted in the U.S. Army Air Forces and flew C-54 transport planes across the North Atlantic, Africa, and India. After a year, he was honorably discharged to return to his company.

Combs was the state director of Civil Defense for Air from 1951 to 1954. He was also associated with Lockheed Aircraft's Skunk Works, working on the U-2, the F-104, and the SR-71 Blackbird projects.

In 1958, Combs Aircraft operated from Stapleton Airport and grew into of the largest network of aircraft sales and service centers in the United States, and the leading Beechcraft distributor in the United States. In 1962, he sold Mountain State Aviation. By 1964, he was the largest Beechcraft distributor in the world. Combs developed and implemented business practices that are now industry standards.

President John F. Kennedy appointed Combs to Project Beacon which was tasked with modernizing air traffic control systems in the United States. Combs developed a plan to separate air traffic based on aircraft performance . Many of Combs' suggestions are still used today by the FAA. He was also a consultant to NASA during the early days of the crewed space program and helped create an air-training base in Arizona for CIA Covert Operations.

Comb Aircraft was sold to Gates Rubber Company for $1.5 million in December 1966. Renamed Combs Gates Denver Inc., it became a subsidiary of Gates Aviation Corp. Combs decided to retire.

In December 1969, stockholders elected Combs to serve as president of the board of directors of Gates Learjet, a new merger of Gates Rubber and Lear Jet Industries. In October 1970, he moved to Wichita, Kansas to oversee Gates Learjet, which manufactured corporate airplanes. His salary was around $50,000 a year, but the company was failing with a $13 million deficit. Combs said, “When I first got down there, I said to the sales manager, ‘What are our hot prospects?' He had about three. We had about 800 employees and half-built bodies of airplanes laying around. There were no sales. I was told it was because the market was bad. I said, ‘No, it's the way we’re running things!’”

Under Combs’ leadership, Gates Learjet made a remarkable financial turnaround, with some $15 million in the bank and no debt by June 1972. It became the largest manufactures of business aircraft in the world. In 1975, he relocated the business from Wichita to Tucson, Arizona. The Learjet was the first United States civil aircraft to be FAA-approved for a normal cruise at 51,000 feet. It was also the first plane to incorporate NASA's thrust-enhancing "winglet" technology. He retired in 1982 when the company had $240 million in equity.

Combs was also the founder of the national chain of corporate airplane service centers, AMR Combs.

=== Writing ===
Neil Armstrong gave Combs a copy of the Wright brothers notebooks. Combs was amazed by what he read, and even went to Hollywood to try and put together a television show about the brothers. When that did not pan out, he decided to write a book. In 1979, Combs', Kill Devil Hill: Discovering the Secret of the Wright Brothers, was published. It received the James J. Streiberg Award from the Aviation/Space Writer's Foundation and the National Air and Space Museum.

He also wrote a trilogy of western novels, starting with Brules in 1992. Brules won a Big Horse Award from Conquistadores del Cielo.

=== Professional affiliations ===
Combs served on the board of the National Aeronautic Association and the Aerospace Industries Association. He was also a president of the Wings Club.

He was chairman of the Colorado State Game and Fish Commission and served on the Colorado Aeronautics Commission and the Colorado State Air and Water Pollution Board.

== Publications ==
=== Nonfiction ===
- Kill Devil Hill: Discovering the Secret of the Wright Brothers, with Martin Caiden. Houghton-Mifflin, 1979. ISBN 978-0-395-28216-8.
- At the Battle of Little Big Horn Where Was Custer? Ternstyle Press, 1999 ISBN 978-0-940053-03-8

=== Fiction ===
- Brules. Island Books, 1995. ISBN 9780440217282
- The Scout. Dell, 1996. ISBN 9780440217299
- Legend of the Painted Horse. Dell, 1997.ISBN 9780440217329

=== Articles and presentations ===
- "The Air Age Was Now" with Martin Caiden. American Heritage vol. 31:1 (December 1979).
- "Four Flights at Kill Devil," Dayton Daily News, (January 27, 1980): 89.
- Twelve Seconds that Changed the World: The Amazing Story of the Wright Brothers. Washington, D.C.: American Society for Aerospace Education, 1982

=== Video ===
- How Strong Is The Wind —40 minutes. TernStyle Press, Ltd, 1983. 303-790-8250

== Awards ==
- 1998: Exceptional Achievement Award, Soaring Society of America
- 1997: World Distance Award, Soaring Society of America for completing 40,000 km WDA
- 1994: Exceptional Achievement Award, Soaring Society of America
- 1993: Big Horse Award, Conquistadores del Cielo, for Brules
- 1985: Wright Brothers Memorial Trophy, National Aeronautic Association
- 1985: Exceptional Achievement Award, Soaring Society of America
- 1984: Elder Statesman of Aviation Award, National Aeronautic Association
- 1981: Distinguished Achievement Award, Wings Club
- 1980: James J. Streiberg Award, Aviation/Space Writer's Foundation, National Air and Space Museum, for Kill Devil Hill
- 1974: Man of the Year, General Aviation Awards, Federal Aviation Administration
- 1968: Diamond Distance Flight #90 (Int #609), Soaring Society of America
- 1964: Gold Distance Flight #195, Soaring Society of America
- 1964: Silver Distance Fli`ght #813, Soaring Society of America
- 1962: Man of the Year, Beechcraft
- Distinguished Service Award, FAA/U.S Department of Transportation

== Honors ==
- In 2003, he was named one of the century's 100 Aviation Pioneers during a ceremony held at Wright Brothers National Memorial.
- In 2001, the National Aviation Hall of Fame named its Harry B. Combs Research Center in his honor.
- In 1997, he was selected to present The Ralph Stanton Barnaby Lecture to the Soaring Society of America.
- In 1995, the Soaring Society of America created the Henry Combs Perpetual Trophy, recognizing 200+ Diamond Distance Flights
- In 1996, he was inducted into the National Aviation Hall of Fame.
- In 1983, he became an honorary member of the Lafayette Flying Corps.
- In 1973, he was inducted into the Colorado Aviation Hall of Fame.

== Personal life ==
In 1936, Combs married Clara Van Schaack. They had three children—Harry B. Combs Jr., Anthony "Tony" Combs, and Clara Combs—before divorcing in 1954. He married his second wife Virginia (Ginney) in 1956.

Combs liked skiing, fishing, and big game hunting, going on safaris in Botswana, Kenya, Mozambique, Uganda, and Zambia. He was an avid horseman and owned three cattle ranches in Colorado—The Sleeping Indian in Ridgeway, a 19,000-acre ranch and game preserve in Elbert and El Paso counties, and a 6,000-acre cattle ranch and game reserve in Ouray County. After he retired, he summered at a ranch in Montana and spent the winters in Wickenburg. However, he also maintained a house in Denver.

For the First Flight Centennial Celebration of the Wright brothers' first flight, Combs donated a full-scale reproduction of the 1903 Wright Flyer to the National Park Service. Valued at $1 million, the airplane replica was reversed engineered using documents from the Wright brothers. On December 17, 2003, he attended the dedication ceremonies for the Combs-Wright Flyer at Kitty Hawk. The replica was displayed at the Wright Brothers National Memorial at Kill Devil Hills, North Carolina. He gave $1.2 million to the National Aviation Hall of Fame in 2001 for a learning and research center.

In 2003, he died in New York City at the age of 90 due to a heart condition.
