= Aviators Code Initiative =

Aviation recommended practices

AMCC Logo

The Aviators Code Initiative (ACI), formerly the Aviators Model Code of Conduct, is a set of model recommended practices designed to improve general aviation safety and airmanship.

== Overview ==
Developed by a group of aviation professionals, the voluntary Aviators Code Initiative has produced a family of voluntary aviation codes. For example, the Aviators Model Code of Conduct (AMCC) "recommends operating practices to enhance the quality and safety" of general aviation flight operations. The AMCC described behaviors that pilots and mechanics should exercise as good aviation citizens, including:

- making safety the highest priority;
- seeking excellence in airmanship;
- recognizing and managing risks effectively, and using sound principles of risk management;
- developing and exercising good judgment; and sound principles of aeronautical decision-making;
- maintaining situational awareness, and adhering to prudent operating practices and personal operating parameters;
- aspiring to professionalism;
- acting with responsibility and courtesy; and
- adhering to applicable laws and regulations.

The ACI family of codes is designed to be adapted by its implementers. It currently consists of nine volumes:

- Aviation Maintenance Technicians Model Code of Conduct
- Aviators Model Code of Conduct
- Designated Pilot Examiners Model Code of Conduct
- Flight Instructors Model Code of Conduct
- Flight Safety in the Drone Age (for manned aircraft pilots)
- Glider Aviators Model Code of Conduct
- Gyroplane Aviators Model Code of Conduct
- Helicopter Pilots Model Code of Conduct
- Light Sport Aviators Model Code of Conduct
- Seaplane Pilots Model Code of Conduct
- Student Pilots Model Code of Conduct
- Unmanned Aircraft Systems Pilots Code (UASPC)

The Flight Instructors Model Code of Conduct in particular has been embraced by the aviation education community. Retired airline captain and aviation author Barry Schiff notes that "it is an outstanding document that belongs in every instructor's flight kit." The FAA Safety Briefing characterizes the AMCC as "Guiding Principles for Instructors". Participants in the Master Instructor Continuing Education Program are required "to subscribe to and abide by an aviation educator's code of conduct" and are provided with examples that include three volumes of the AMCC. The Society of Aviation and Flight Educators provides links to several volumes of the AMCC in the Public Resource Center on its website. Additionally, the FAA introduces the AMCC in the "Instructor Responsibilities and Professionalism" chapter of its Aviation Instructor's Handbook.

Examples of the AMCC being promoted by and adapted to other sectors in general aviation include the Lake Elsinore Soaring Club, the Lancair Owners & Builders Organization, Gyroplane Aviators, and the Civil Air Patrol.

In January 2013, The Aviators Model Code of Conduct for Kids was released to "introduce students to what it takes to be a good pilot, to fly safely, and be a good passenger if they take a ride in a small plane." In June 2016, AMCC released Flight Safety in the Drone Age, offering safety guidance when operating near drones. The UAS Pilots Code was released in January 2018 to provide guidance for unmanned aircraft pilots and operators. In 2025, ACI and the Florida Tech Evans Library announced a new affiliation, allowing the full collection of ACI digital content, including the centerpiece Aviators Model Code of Conduct, to be hosted and publicly available through Evans Library’s online Repository.

== Permanent Editorial Board ==
This non-profit's volunteer Permanent Editorial Board (PEB) provides "editorial oversight and stewardship of the Aviators Code Initiative (ACI), implementation of the family of codes of conduct, and supporting materials." PEB members included:

- Don Arendt, Ph.D, CFI, ATP - FAA (ret.)
- Michael S. Baum, JD, MBA, ATP, Principal, Ind. Monitoring, LLC
- Dale DeRemer, Ph.D., ATP - Professor Emeritus
- Jim Lauerman, ATP - President AVEMCO (ret.)
- Donna Neal, Ph.D. - Dir. of Faculty Operations, UAAF Academy
- Ric Peri, VP -, Government & Industry Affairs, Aircraft Electronics Association
- Michael Radomsky, CFII - Pres. Emeritus, COPA
- Bill Rhodes, Ph.D., - Prof., Lt. Col USAF (ret.), Aerworthy Consulting, LLC
- Stan Rose, CEO, Helicopter Safety Alliance
- Rusty Sachs, JD, DhE, MCFI emeritus, Founder, Master Instruction, Inc.
- Josh Smith, CFII - Dir., Aviation Institute of Maintenance
- Don Steinman, ATP, CFII, Captain, American Airlines (ret.)
- Thomas Turner, ATP, CFI - Exec. Dir., American Bonanza Society
- Donna Wilt, Ph.D., ATP, CFII, Wilt Aviation Consulting, LLC

== Structure ==
The AMCC consists of the following seven sections (each containing principles and sample recommended practices):

1. General Responsibilities of Aviators
2. Passengers and People on the Surface
3. Training and Proficiency
4. Security
5. Environmental Issues
6. Use of Technology
7. Advancement and Promotion of General Aviation

For each aspect, the Code of Conduct covers governing principles (e.g., "minimize the discharge of fuel, oil, and other chemicals into the environment") and lays out specific practical recommendations (e.g., "Use a Gasoline Analysis Test Separator jar for all fuel sampling). Where applicable, sourced commentary and annotations are used to substantiate principles and recommendations, and to provide drafting considerations.

Recognizing the need for early socialization, recommendations for integrating the Code of Conduct into flight training (including sample lesson plans) are collected in Notes For Instructors.

The Code of Conduct is intended to be specialized by aircraft operation and to evolve over time and place.

Foreign-language translations incorporate national and regionally-specific practices and regulations.

Notes for Prospective Implementers provides guidelines and resources for individuals and organizations adopting the Code of Conduct.

Flight Safety in the Drone Age is organized in five sections: (1) General Education and Preparation, (2) Preflight Operations, (3) In-flight Operations, (4) Post-flight Operations, and (5) Aviation Community.

== Adoption ==
In the United States, the Federal Aviation Administration includes links to the Code of Conduct in their list of online resources.

Other users and promoters of the Code of Conduct include major aircraft type clubs, air carriers, flight schools, insurers, manufacturers, and other general aviation players, including:

- Avemco Insurance Company
- Cessna Owners Organization
- Center for the Study of Ethics in the Professions, Illinois Institute of Technology
- Cirrus Owners and Pilots Association
- Civil Air Patrol
- Flight Design
- Gleim
- International Helicopter Safety Team
- Mooney International Corporation
- National Association of Flight Instructors
- Piper Owners Society
- Qatar Airways
- United States Helicopter Safety Team
