= Ethical code =

Ethical concept

Ethical codes are adopted by organizations to assist their members or employees in understanding the difference between right and wrong and in applying that understanding to their decisions. An ethical code generally refers to either a code of business ethics, a codes of conduct for employees, or a code of professional practice, and many organizations use the phrases ethical code and code of conduct interchangeably. Ethical codes are often adopted by management and also employers, not to promote a particular moral theory, but rather because they are seen as pragmatic necessities for running an organization in a complex society in which moral concepts play an important part. Even organizations and communities that may be considered criminal in nature may have ethical codes of conduct, official or unofficial.

They are distinct from moral codes that may apply to the culture, education, and religion of a whole society. It is debated whether the politicians should apply a code of ethics, or whether it is a profession entirely discretionary, just subject to compliance with the law: however, recently codes of practice have been approved in this field.

Acts which violate ethical codes may also violate a law or regulation and can therefore be punishable at law or by government agency remedies.

Codes seek to define and delineate the difference between conduct and behavior that is malum in se, malum prohibitum, and good practice. Sometimes ethical codes include sections that are meant to give firm rules, but some offer general guidance, and sometimes the words are merely aspirational.

In sum, a code of ethics is an attempt to codify "good and bad behavior".

== Corporate or business ethics ==
In business, a code of ethics will start by setting out the values that underpin the code and will describe an organization's obligation to its stakeholders. The code is publicly available and addressed to anyone with an interest in that organization's activities and the way it operates. It will include details of how the organization plans to implement its values and vision, as well as guidance to staff on ethical standards and how to achieve them. However, a code of conduct is generally addressed to and intended for the organization's leaders and staff. It usually sets out restrictions on behavior, and will be far more focused on compliance or rules than on values or principles.

In the United States, the Federal Acquisition Regulation (the federal rules concerned with government contracting) require contractors to "conduct themselves with the highest degree of integrity and honesty", and to this end demand that "contractors should have a written code of business ethics and conduct". The federal rule, built on earlier policies adopted by the Department of Defense, Veterans Affairs, and the Environmental Protection Agency, adds that "to promote compliance with such code of business ethics and conduct, contractors should have an employee business ethics and compliance training program and an internal control system".

== Professional ethics ==
A code of practice is adopted by a profession (or by a governmental or non-governmental organization) to regulate that profession. A code of practice may be styled as a code of professional responsibility, which will discuss difficult issues and difficult decisions that will often need to be made, and then provide a clear account of what behavior is considered "ethical" or "correct" or "right" in the circumstances. In a membership context, failure to comply with a code of practice can result in expulsion from the professional organization. In its 2007 International Good Practice Guidance, Defining and Developing an Effective Code of Conduct for Organizations, the International Federation of Accountants provided the following working definition:

"Principles, values, standards, or rules of behavior that guide the decisions, procedures and systems of an organization in a way that (a) contributes to the welfare of its key stakeholders, and (b) respects the rights of all constituents affected by its operations."

For example, the Society of Professional Journalists (SPJ) Code of Ethics outlines a list of codes journalists should follow. The code begins with the preamble:

Members of the Society of Professional Journalists believe that public enlightenment is the forerunner of justice and the foundation of democracy. Ethical journalism strives to ensure the free exchange of information that is accurate, fair and thorough. An ethical journalist acts with integrity. The Society declares these four principles as the foundation of ethical journalism and encourages their use in its practice by all people in all media.

== Examples ==
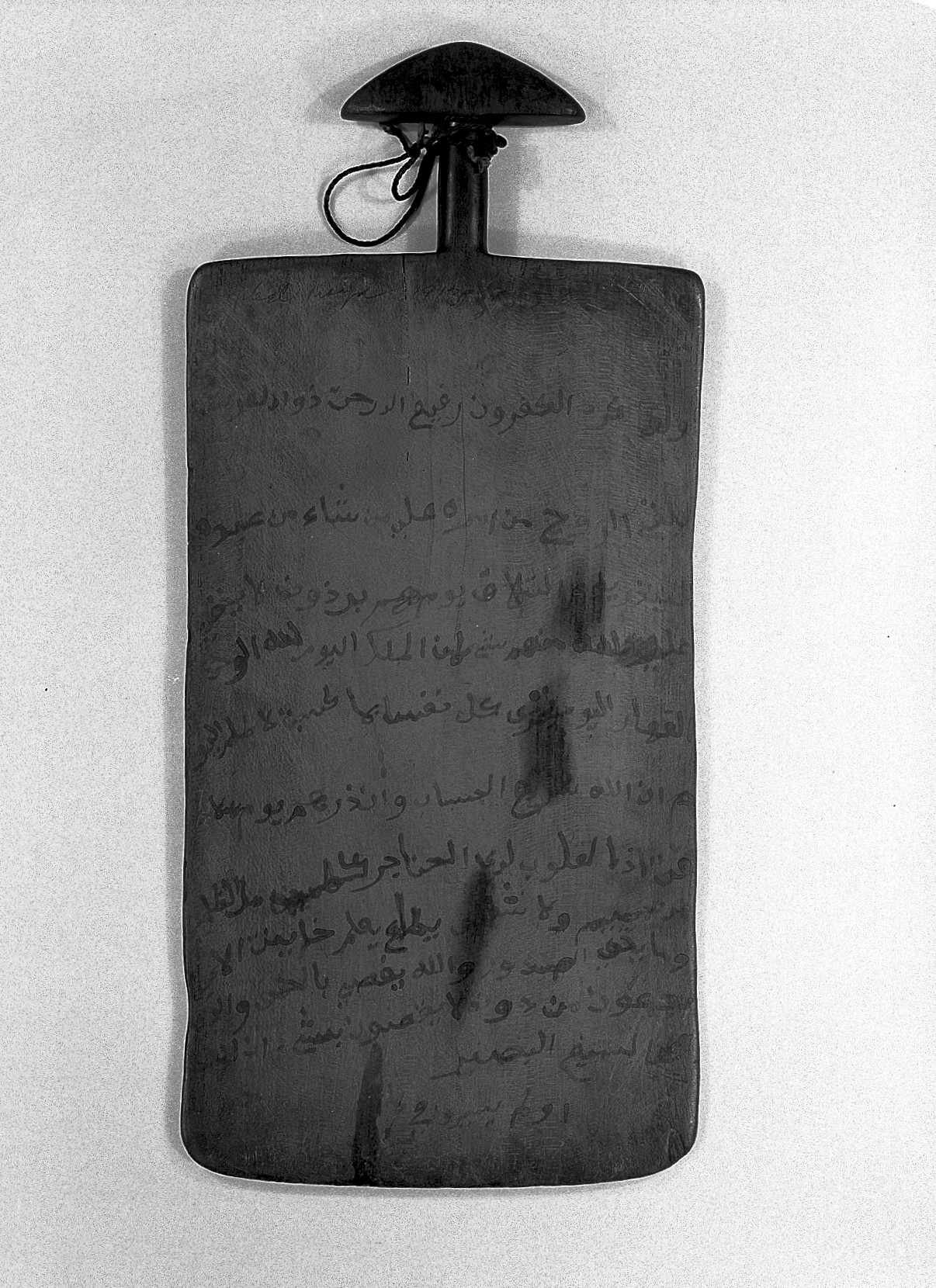
Wood tablet from Jebel Moya, inscribed with an ethical code of conduct, relating to Moses (line 7) and Pharaoh (line 12)

Medical workers and physicians
Code of Conduct for the International Red Cross and Red Crescent Movement and NGOs in Disaster Relief
Declaration of Geneva
Hippocratic Oath
Percival's Medical Ethics
Madrid Declaration on Ethical Standards for Psychiatric Practice
Military, warfare, and other armed conflict
Bushidō (Japanese samurai)
Code of the U.S. Fighting Force
International Code of Conduct against Ballistic Missile Proliferation ("ICOC" or "Hague Code of Conduct")
Israel Defense Forces Code of Conduct
Pirate code
Uniform Code of Military Justice (United States)
Warrior code
Religious
Code of Ma'at (Ancient Egypt)
Eight Precepts (Buddhism)
Five Precepts (Buddhism)
Golden Rule / Ethic of reciprocity (various)
Seven Laws of Noah (Judaism)
Patimokkha (Buddhism)
Quran (Islam)
Rule of St. Benedict (Christian monasticism)
Ten Commandments (Abrahamic religions)
Ten Precepts (Buddhism)
Ten Precepts (Taoism)
Yamas and niyama (Hindu scriptures)
Others
The Society of Professional Journalists Code of Ethics
Journalist's Creed
American Library Association Code of Ethics
Applied ethics
Media ethics
Aviators Model Code of Conduct
Global civics
ICC Cricket Code of Conduct
Institute of Internal Auditors, Code of Ethics
Moral Code of the Builder of Communism
NSPE Code of Ethics for Engineers

== See also ==
- Medical ethics
- Public sector ethics
- IDF Code of Ethics

== Sources ==
- Ladd, John (1991). "The Quest for a Code of Professional Ethics: An Intellectual and Moral Confusion". In Johnson, Deborah G. (ed.). Ethical Issues in Engineering. Englewood Cliffs, NJ: Prentice Hall. ISBN 978-0-13-290578-7. OCLC 851033915.
- Flores, Albert (1998). "The Philosophical Basis of Engineering Codes of Ethics". In Vesilind, P. Aarne; Gunn, Alastair S. (eds.). Engineering Ethics and the Environment. Cambridge: Cambridge University Press. pp. 201–209. ISBN 978-0-521-58112-7. OCLC 300458305.
