= Cavagnaro =

Cavagnaro is a surname. Notable people with the surname include:

- Carlos Cavagnaro (born 1946), Argentine football manager
- Catherine Cavagnaro (born 1965), American mathematician and aviator
- Osvaldo Cavagnaro (born 1938), Argentine rower
