= Master Instructor Continuing Education Program =

Official MICEP Logo

The Master Instructor Continuing Education Program (MICEP) is the world's largest voluntary accreditation program for aviation educators and is based on advanced professional standards and peer review. The program is administered by Master Instructors LLC of Longmont, Colorado, and is open to all qualified aviation educators regardless of their other affiliations. MICEP designations identify and recognize educators who have demonstrated an ongoing commitment to excellence and professional growth in, as well as service to, the aviation community.

Accreditations are valid for 24 calendar months and are renewable based on documenting activity in five broad, aviation-related categories: Educator, Service to the Aviation Community, Creator of Media, Continuing Education, and Participant. MICEP is approved for credit under the FAA WINGS Pilot Proficiency Program, and can be used to renew an unexpired flight instructor certificate.

== Designations ==
- Master Aviation Educator (MAE)
- Master Certificated Flight Instructor (MCFI)
- Master Certificated Flight Instructor-Aerobatic (MCFI-A)
- Master Certificated Flight Instructor-Helicopter (MCFI-H)
- Master Ground Instructor (MGI)
- Master Instructor Emeritus (MIE)

== Designees ==
According to the General Aviation Awards Program, from 1998 through 2014, 25 of the 31 combined national winners in the Certificated Flight Instructor of the Year and the FAA Safety Team Representative of the Year categories were MICEP designees.

In a survey of designees, the majority of program participants reported a corresponding 10–40 percent increase in income as a result of their MICEP designation.

== Derivative programs ==
MICEP was the first such accreditation program for aviation educators. The program's underlying principles coupled with its success have been the model for at least two other similar programs. The Soaring Society of America (SSA), for example, instituted a Master Instructor Cross-Country Program "in response to member demands for better access to cross country instruction". A program offered by the National Association of Flight Instructors (NAFI) draws heavily on MICEP's original concepts, formatting, and in many cases, even its wording. In contrast to the derivatives, membership in a particular organization is not a prerequisite to apply for a MICEP designation.

== History ==
In 1995, longtime aviation educators JoAnn and Sandy Hill initiated research, development, and vetting of the Master Instructor Continuing Education Program. At the time, the Hills were also serving as volunteer board members with NAFI.

MICEP was launched in 1997 through NAFI, allegedly under a non-exclusive, royalty-free, implied license with the Hills. Under a separate agreement, the Hills received a portion of application fees collected by NAFI as nominal compensation for administering the program as well as reimbursement of administrative costs.

Since its debut in 1997, the Hills had continuously administered, improved, and expanded MICEP. In early 2009, the Hills severed their ties and terminated the implied license with NAFI. The Hills then formed Master Instructors LLC to provide the "autonomy and independence to ensure the continued development and integrity of the Master Instructor Program".

After failed attempts to get NAFI to cease its alleged continued misappropriation of the Hills' intellectual property, a copyright infringement lawsuit was filed against that organization.

A year after filing the copyright infringement lawsuit, the Hills agreed to dismiss the case in 2010, citing among other things that they felt "vindicated by the response of the marketplace to our program. Moreover, events of the last year have simply rendered many of our concerns irrelevant to the continued prosecution of our case."

MICEP transitioned in 2013 to an Internet-based application and review process automated using Fluidreview's online application management system. The program's web presence was enhanced with an overhaul of its web and social media sites.
