= Dickens Opera House =

- U.S. National Register of Historic Places
- U.S. Historic district – Contributing property
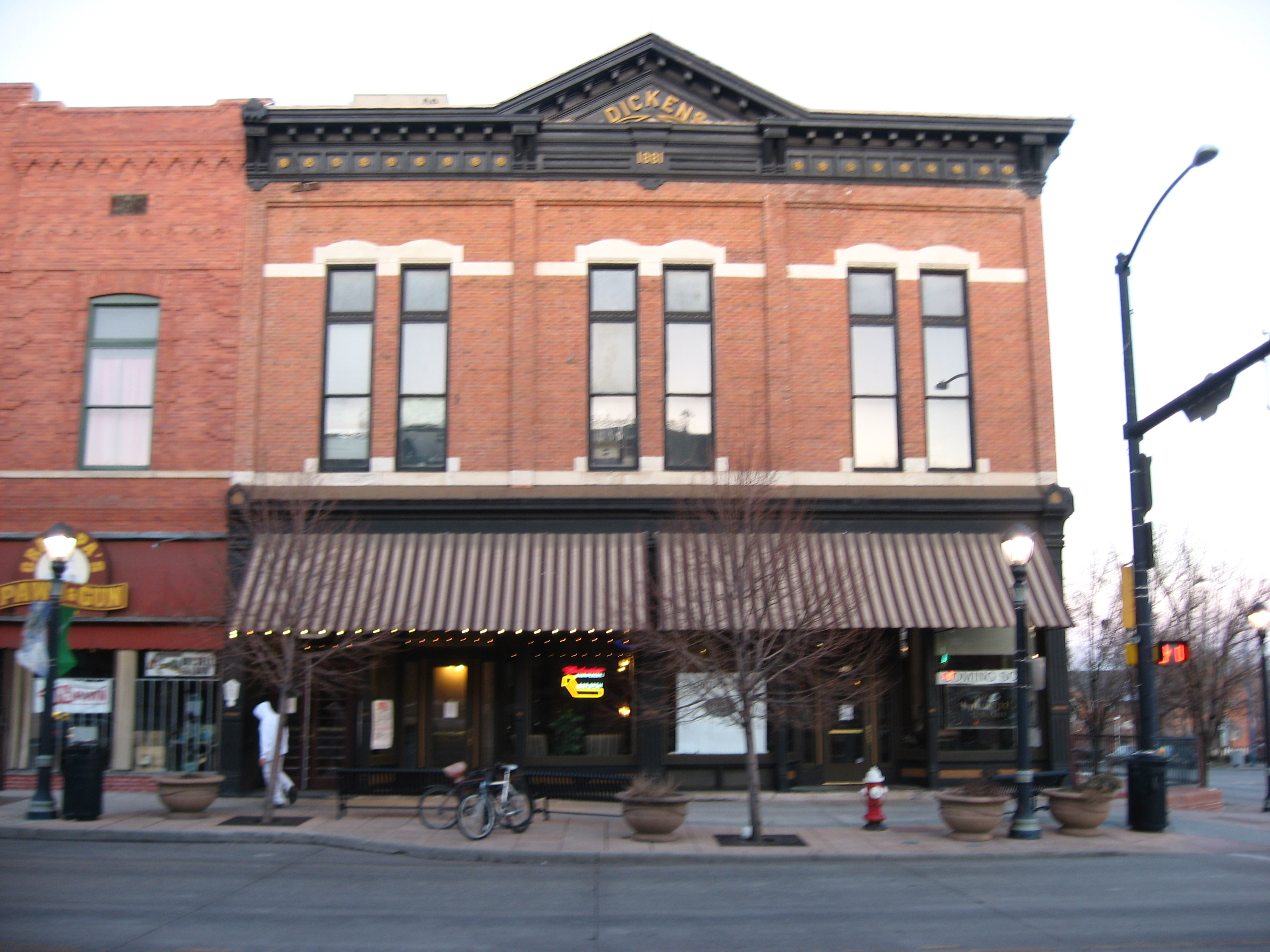
- Building in 2009

- Location within Colorado
- Location: 302 Main St., Longmont, Colorado
- Coordinates: 40°09′52″N 105°06′06″W
- Area: less than one acre
- Built: 1881
- Architectural style: 19th Century Commercial
- Part of: Downtown Longmont Historic District (ID100001501)
- NRHP reference No.: 87000702

Significant dates
- Added to NRHP: July 28, 1987
- Designated CP: August 28, 2017

The Dickens Opera House, at 302 Main St. in Longmont, Colorado, was built in 1881 and expanded in 1905. It was listed on the National Register of Historic Places in 1987, and was included as a contributing building in the 2017-designated Downtown Longmont Historic District.

It is a two-story brick "19th Century Commercial style" building, prominent in Longmont at the northeast corner of Third Avenue and Main Street.

It was built by William Henry Dickens, a relative of author Charles Dickens, who came to the area in 1860.

It is significant historically as "Longmont's social and cultural center and meeting hall for other community events."

Originally it held the Farmer's National Bank on the first floor and its auditorium on the second floor. It was vacant from 1978 to 1986. It now houses a number of restaurants, and cultural events.
