= Downtown Longmont Historic District =

Historic district in Colorado, United States

- U.S. National Register of Historic Places
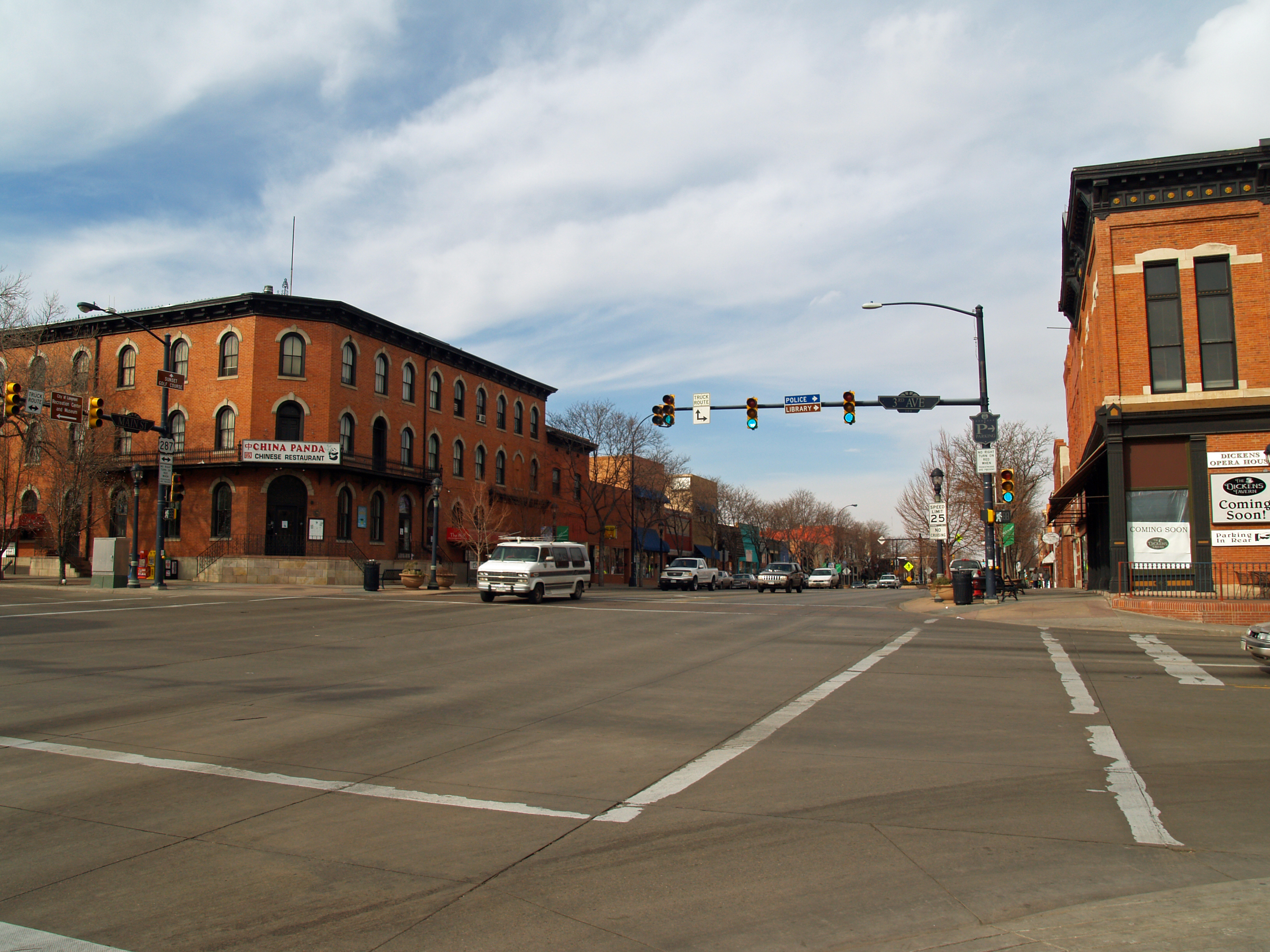
- 300 block of Main Street, in 2009

- Location within Colorado Location within the United States
- Location: Roughly Main, Coffman & Kimbark Sts. between 3rd & 5th Aves., Longmont, Colorado
- Coordinates: 40°09′57″N 105°06′09″W
- Built by: Multiple
- Architect: Multiple
- NRHP reference No.: 100001501
- Added to NRHP: August 28, 2017

The Downtown Longmont Historic District, in Longmont, Colorado, is a historic district which was listed on the National Register of Historic Places in 2017.

The district includes 83 buildings, 69 of which are deemed contributing buildings, and 17 of which were already designated Longmont Local Landmarks. Rehabilitation work on contributing buildings is eligible for tax credit funding; the local landmarks require a local Certificate of Appropriateness before exterior work, including signage and painting, can be done. The district also includes four buildings already individually listed on the National Register of Historic Places:

- St. Stephen's Episcopal Church (listed in 1975),
- the Firehouse Art Center building (listed in 1985),
- the Dickens Opera House (listed in 1987), and
- the Longmont Carnegie Library (listed in 1992).

The district map shows an irregular outline enclosing an area equivalent to about six complete city blocks.

The district was designated in a ceremony at the Firehouse Art Center in February, 2017. "As a result of efforts that began in 2012, a portion of downtown Longmont has been named to the National Register of Historic Places. / The staff with the city and the Longmont Downtown Development Authority spearheaded the effort to gain recognition for the district, which is generally bound by 3rd Avenue to the south, 5th Avenue to the north, Coffman Street to the west, and Emery Street to the east. “People really love and value our downtown area’s authenticity — it’s a real working main street,” development authority executive director Kimberlee McKee said. “We just really want to bring public awareness to our history.” / The district is made up of 83 buildings, 69 of which were built between 1879 and 1967 and are considered historically significant."

“Longmont has so many gems,” Visit Longmont Executive Director Nancy Rezac said, adding that she expects the historic designation will boost downtown tourism.

It includes the I.O.O.F. Building, a.k.a. I.O.O.F. Lodge #29, in the 400 block of Main Street.

== See also ==
- National Register of Historic Places listings in Boulder County, Colorado
