= St. Vrain Historical Society =

Historical society in Longmont, Colorado

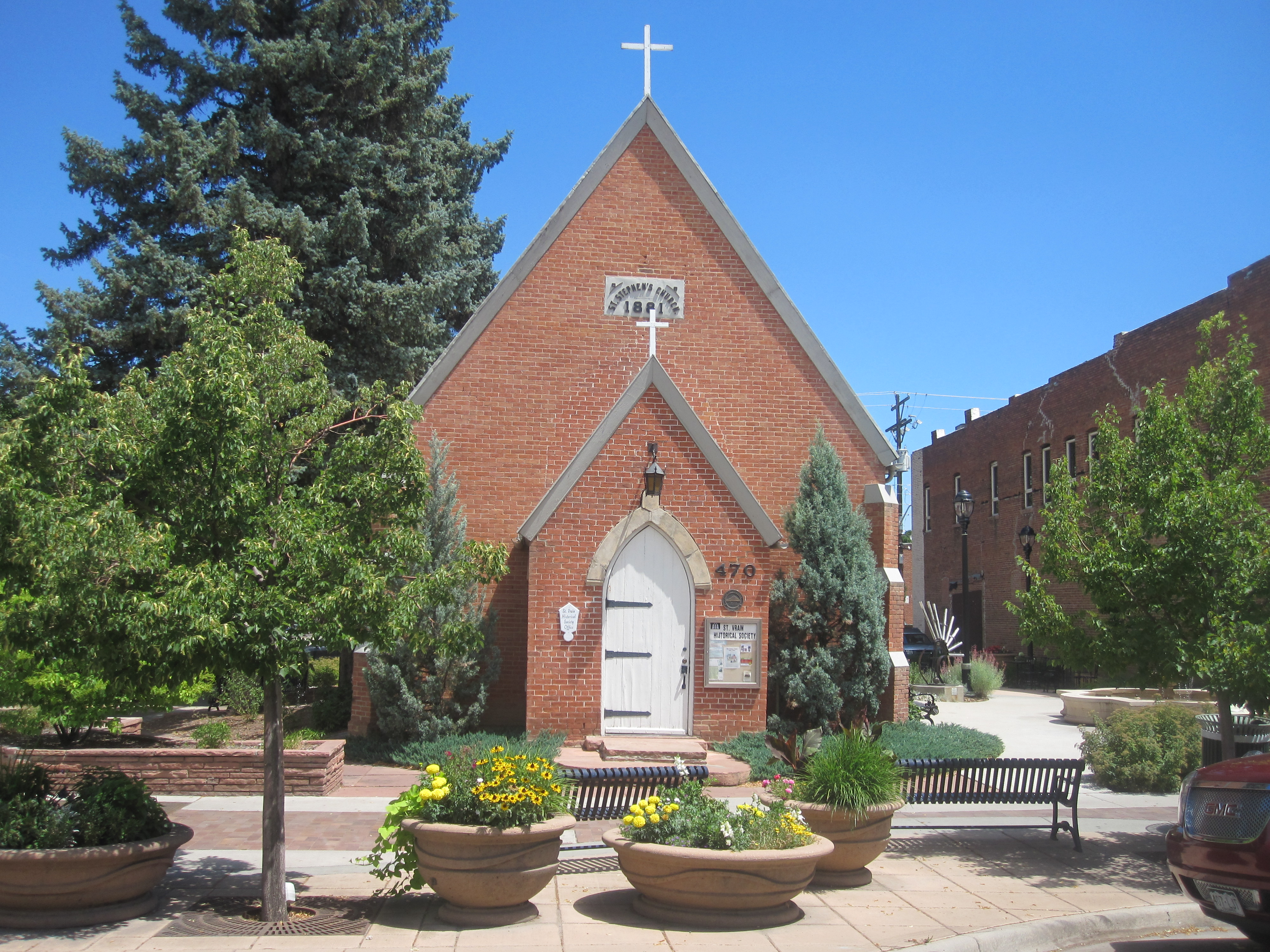
"Old" St. Stephen's Church, home to the St. Vrain Historical Society

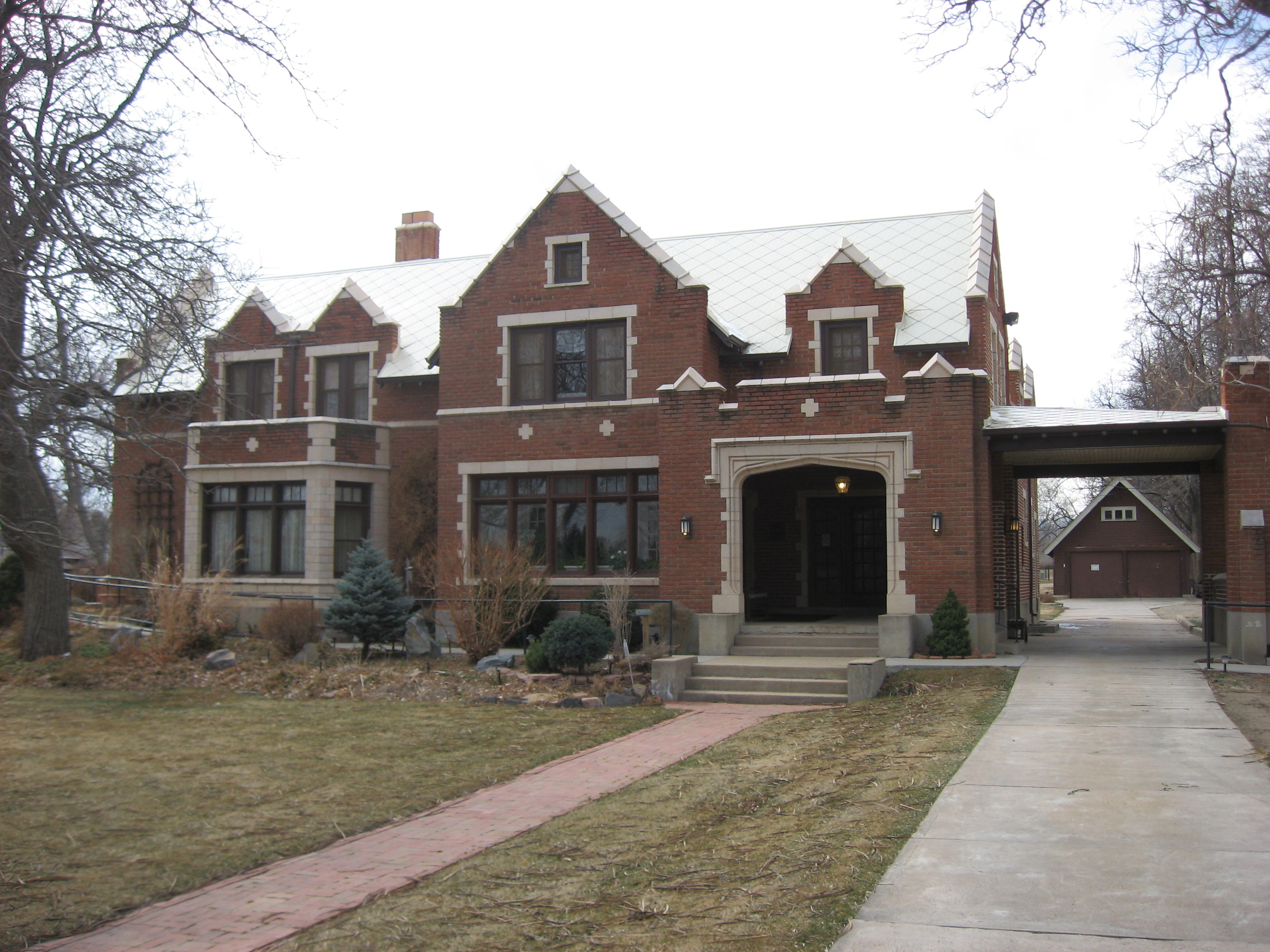
Hoverhome, a 1910s English Tudor, Gothic Revival home

The St. Vrain Historical Society, Inc. is a non-profit organization in Longmont, Colorado and was officially organized in 1963. The Society supports and maintains several historic properties: the Old Mill Park, Hoverhome, Hover Farmstead, and the Old St Stephens Church. Tours of Old Mill Park and Hover Farmstead can be arranged.

The mission of the Society is to promote historic education and preservation in Longmont and the surrounding St. Vrain Valley.

== See also ==
- List of historical societies in Colorado
