= Longmont Carnegie Library =

- U.S. National Register of Historic Places
- U.S. Historic district – Contributing property
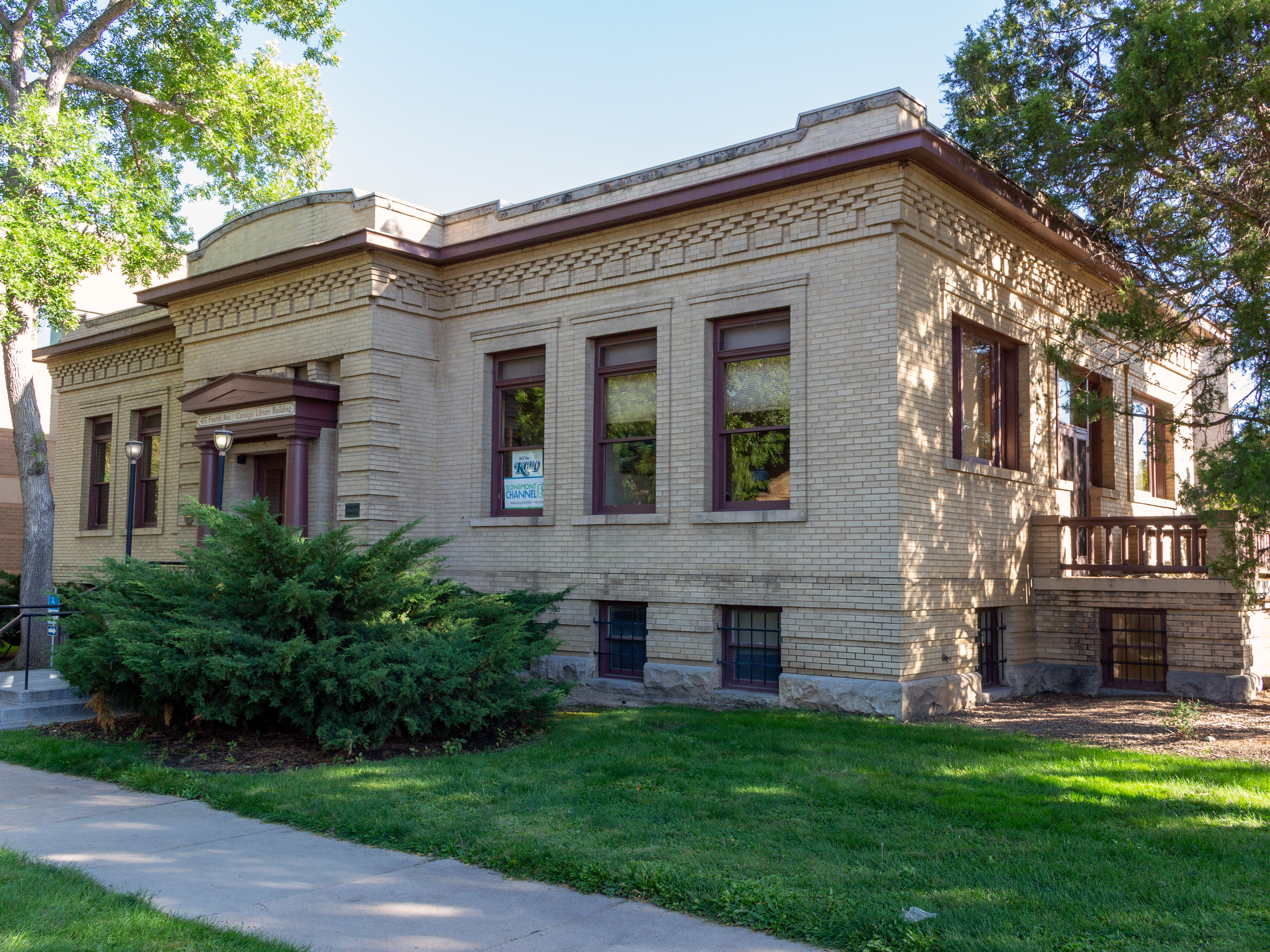
- Former library building in 2019

- Location within Colorado
- Location: 457 Fourth Ave., Longmont, Colorado
- Coordinates: 40°09′56″N 105°06′01″W
- Area: less than one acre
- Built: 1912-13
- Built by: Wiggins & Sprague
- Architect: Benjamin C. Viney
- Architectural style: Renaissance Revival
- Part of: Downtown Longmont Historic District (ID100001501)
- NRHP reference No.: 92001406

Significant dates
- Added to NRHP: November 3, 1992
- Designated CP: August 28, 2017

The Longmont Carnegie Library, at 457 Fourth Ave. in Longmont, Colorado, is a Carnegie library which was completed in 1913. It was listed on the National Register of Historic Places in 1992, and was included as a contributing building in the Downtown Longmont Historic District in 2017.

Its construction was funded by a $12,500 Carnegie grant given on December 13, 1907, but there were delays due to controversy in the city obtaining a site and lining up maintenance funding. A library tax proposition was voted down in 1908, but a site was acquired by the city in 1912. It is a one-story rectangular simplified-Renaissance Revival-style building. Benjamin C. Viney was its supervising architect.

It served as a library until 1975. In 1992 the building served as a City Hall Annex hosting several city departments.

It was deemed significant "for its social significance in association with Andrew Carnegie's nationwide public library movement beginning in 1886", and it was also deemed to have "architectural significance in its high quality materials and construction and for its Renaissance Revival design by English born Longmont architect Benjamin C. Viney, an associate of the prominent Scottish architect Thomas McLaren of Colorado Springs." McLaren designed the previously completed Carnegie library in Boulder.
