= St. Stephen's Episcopal Church (Longmont, Colorado) =

Historic church in Colorado, United States

- St. Stephen's Episcopal Church, 1881
- U.S. National Register of Historic Places
- U.S. Historic district – Contributing property
- Colorado State Register of Historic Properties
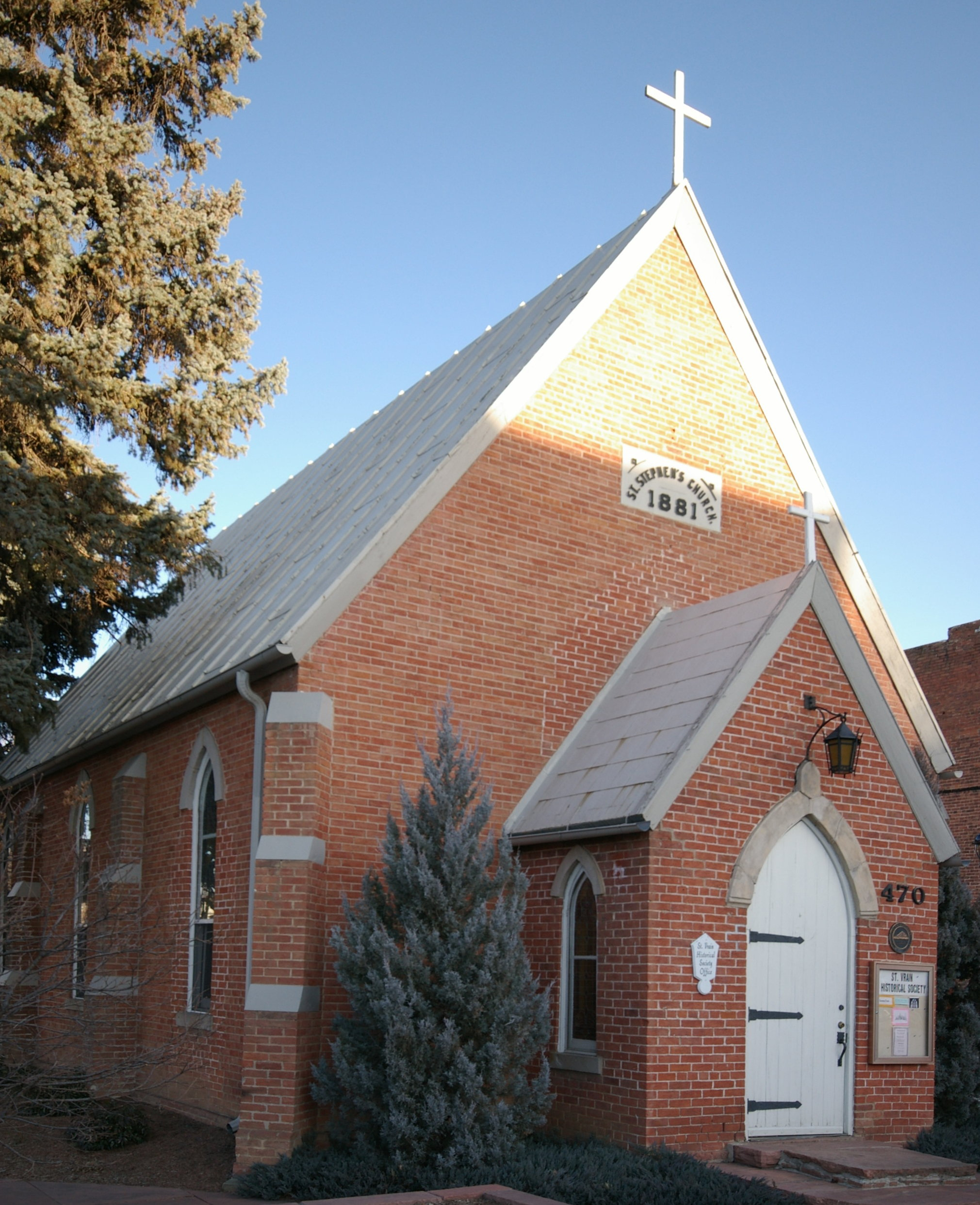
- Location: 470 Main Street, Longmont, Colorado
- Coordinates: 40°10′3″N 105°6′6″W
- Part of: Downtown Longmont Historic District (ID100001501)
- NRHP reference No.: 75000501
- CSRHP No.: 5BL.355

Significant dates
- Added to NRHP: February 24, 1975
- Designated CP: August 28, 2017

St. Stephen's Episcopal Church, 1881 is a historical church building in Longmont, Colorado. Also known to be middle of Longmont, Colorado back when it started to develop.

The church is now home to the St. Vrain Historical Society.

It was built of red brick which was later painted white.

It was listed on the National Register of Historic Places in 1975, and was included as a contributing building in the 2017-designated Downtown Longmont Historic District.

== See also ==
- National Register of Historic Places listings in Boulder County, Colorado
