= Conquistadores del Cielo =

Secretive club of high-level airline and aerospace industry executives

Conquistadores del Cielo (Spanish for "Conquerors of the Sky") is a secretive club of high-level airline and aerospace industry executives. The Conquistadores del Cielo are still in existence today, stating that they exist "To develop and promote interest in aerospace activities. Sponsoring and giving educational, social, recreational and athletic events and functions that will bring together and unite in fellowship persons interested in the general purpose of the organization, and any other activities that such fellowship shall kindle and inspire. The organization shall be conducted without pecuniary benefit to the membership."

== History ==
The club was founded by Transcontinental & Western Air, later Trans World Airlines (TWA), President William John "Jack" Frye, and Vice President Paul Richert in 1937 as an informal gathering for airline industry giants. Jack Frye was the Conquistadores' first leader. During these initial meetings, Jack Frye proposed a number of his friends and associated come together for an annual meeting at his ranch, A-Bar-A Ranch in Encampment, Wyoming. During these early years, the Conquistadores would go horseback riding, shooting, and hunting, although their recreational activities expanded over time.

In 1938, the Conquistadores expanded their membership to include persons involved in the space industry. The group was officially incorporated as a nonprofit organization in 1941 with EIN 95-6092475.

The Conquistadores were first named in a major media publication in 2010 as airline executives who were attending a Reuters Aerospace and Defense Summit were leaving to go to Wyoming.

According to Rolls-Royce chief executive Sir John Rose, the Conquistadores have a club drinking song, a twist on the song "The Three Caballeros" from the 1944 film The Three Caballeros. The song goes:

'We're Conquistadores, gay Conquistadores

We're birds of a very fine feather!

We're happy amigos no matter where he goes

The One, Two and Three goes, we're always together.

During the 2019 retirement celebration of Southwest Airlines CEO Herb Kelleher, Bill Franke, chairman of Frontier Airlines, Colleen Barrett, Kelleher's replacement emeritus, Bill Cunningham, Southwest's presiding director, and retired General Duncan McNabb broke with a long-standing tradition of silence and shared several stories about Kelleher and the Conquistadores del Cielo. According to Cunningham, the A-Bar-A Ranch sits on 100,000 acres of land, and is "so large it has four climatic zones". Cunningham also alleges that the Conquistadores spend a great deal of time drinking and hunting, though he claims that despite being well armed, little hunting is done, and the only shots had been "exclusively Wild Turkey".

The accounts of Thomas Petzinger, Jr. in his book Hard Landing, recounts his time at the A-Bar-A Ranch and claims that the members "would turn out in cowboy hats and boots – Stephen Wolf in an elegant knitted sweater, perhaps, and Bob Crandall in a leather vest and bolo tie. They would feast on prime rib, buffalo burgers, trout pate, and bacon smoked on Applewood.”

According to one of the Conquistadores Del Cielo Papers at Wright State University in Dayton, Ohio, one of the largest events during the retreats is the initiation ceremony.

“The highlight of the week was the initiation ceremony for new members who had attended three meetings. This ceremony is a pantomime induction with processions of Conquistadores riding down from the hills with lighted torches.

“Initiates are sworn in and dubbed ‘Conquistador.’ The script being read recounts the history of the Conquerors of the Sky. Fireworks conclude the ceremony.

“It is costumed by the workshop which costumes the Royal Spanish Opera in Madrid. Authentic period costumes complete with armor, swords, and full regalia are used. It is an extremely solemn occasion for members involved in the cause of promoting aviation in this country.”

There were allegations that the Conquistadores del Cielo had no female or non-Europe/North America members until in 2002 Korean Air chairman Cho Yang-ho announced his attendance. Additionally, in 2017, Mary Nagelmann was the organization's full-time Executive Director and sole employee. Despite this, the organization has historically been called mostly male.

The organization has $1.2m in annual revenue and spends nearly all of its money on two annual retreats.

== Members ==
Stephen Wolf, Robert Crandall, Beverly F. Dolan (CEO of Textron), Harding L. Lawrence (CEO of Braniff International Airways), David Barger, and Gary Kelly have been members. 2015 members listed on the annual IRS filing include Tom Enders, Scott C. Donnelly, Mark Dunkerley (CEO of Hawaiian Airlines until 2018), Daniel Altobello (Retired Chairman of Mesa Airlines), and Marillyn Hewson. 2016 members also include Marc Parent (CEO of CAE Inc.), Jerry Atkin, John R. Dailey, Robert Fornaro, Randall Greene (CEO of Safe Flight Instrument Corp.), David P. Hess (EVP at United Technologies), Dawne Hickton, David L. Joyce (CEO of GE Aviation), C. Jeffrey Knittel (CEO of Airbus Americas), Lloyd W. Newton, Kelly Ortberg (CEO of Collins Aerospace), Curtis Reusser (CEO of Esterline), Christian Scherer (Chief Commercial Officer of Airbus), Terry Stinson (former CEO of Bell Helicopter), and Jeffrey L. Turner (of Rockwell Collins and Spirit AeroSystems). 2017 members also include Daniel Crowley (CEO of Triumph Group), Cindy Egnotovich (formerly of UTC Aerospace, now Collins Aerospace), Paul Funchino (partner at AE Industrial Partners), August Henningsen (formerly CEO of Lufthansa Technik), and David Melcher.

The Conquistadores became more visible at the public memorial service for Herb Kelleher, when Hudson Drake, an executive with Boeing and Teledyne Technologies as well as a White House Fellow for the Johnson and Nixon administrations, gave a eulogy for Herb. In the short talk, he revealed that the Conquistadores' spring meeting rotates throughout the world and that Herb was initiated in 1990. Conquistadores receive a green jacket and 25-year members receive a yellow jacket. Both Hudson and Herb were at least 25-year members. Herb received the "Big Horse Award", the club's highest honor, in 2005.

== Scandals ==
Although the number one rule within the Conquistadores del Cielo is to "Leave Your Swords at the Door", there have been known instances where the members of the group have either participated in or spoken of incidents of insider trading.

=== Paul Thayer ===
During the 1984 trial of Paul Thayer, former Deputy Secretary of Defense, at least two members of the Conquistadores del Cielo testified against Thayer. Both Thomas Pownall, chairman of Martin Marietta and Coquistadores president, and Harry Gray, chairman of United Technologies, testified that from September 8 through September 12, 1982, Thayer had openly spoken with them about a merger between Bendix Corporation and the Allied Corporation. In 1985 Thayer was sentenced to four years in prison for insider stock-trading.

=== American Airlines and US Airways merger ===
According to American Airlines CEO Tom Horton, the merger between American Airlines and US Airways was initially proposed during a Conquistadores del Cielo retreat at A-Bar-A Ranch.. Horton claims that he pitched the idea to Doug Parker, CEO of American Airlines, during a barbecue lunch. "I made that pitch. We nodded heads to one another," Horton claims.

=== Additional accusations ===
There have been several other instances where the ethics of the Conquistadores del Cielo have been brought into question. In 2008 Tam Travel, Inc. v Delta Air Lines, No. 07-4464 was brought before the United States Court of Appeals, alleging "a conspiracy to eliminate the practice of paying base commissions by various airlines, district court's dismissal of the amended complaint is affirmed, as the plaintiffs' claims against United Airlines were discharged in bankruptcy and the claims against the remaining defendants failed to allege sufficient facts to plausibly suggest a prior illegal agreement." Prosecutors argued that there were opportunities for executives at Delta, American, Northwest, United, and Continental Airlines to conspire during either the International Air Transport Association meetings in 1997 and 1998, or at the industry meetings such as the Conquistadores Del Cielo.
