= Torch Honor Society =

Secret society at Yale University, US

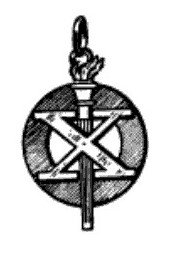
- Badge or watch fob of the Torch Honor Society, 1918
- Founded: March 8, 1916; 110 years ago Sheffield Scientific School, Yale College
- Type: Senior society
- Affiliation: Independent
- Status: Active
- Scope: Local
- Motto: Simus Lux Obscuro in Mundo "Let us be Light in a Dark World"
- Chapters: 1
- Members: 950+ lifetime
- Nickname: Torch
- Headquarters: 442 Temple Street; New Haven, Connecticut 06511; United States

Torch Honor Society, also known as Torch, is a student secret society at Yale College that was initially established in 1916 and reformed in 1995. Its members include former president George H. W. Bush and William F. Buckley Jr.

== History ==
Two seniors at the Sheffield Scientific School of Yale College established the Torch Honor Society on March 8, 1916. However, the establishment of the group was kept secret until December 20, 1916. It was formed as an honor society to recognize the achievements and merit of undergraduate students. Its ideals were "enlightening leadership and beneficent service". The founders selected a charter class of ten men from the junior class and two professors. These charter members were recruited based on both literary and athletic prominence. The group secured rooms in Strathcona Hall.

The society continued to recruit or tap ten juniors each spring but eventually expanded its number to fifteen. In 1947, the Grape Belt and Chautauqua Farmer described selection for membership in Torch as "one of the most important extracurricular campus honors". In 1915, society members began to advocate for a student-edited publication for science and engineering. The result was The Yale Scientific Magazine which first published on May 3, 1917. The society was incorporated in the State of Connecticut on January 21, 1922.

In January 1950, Torch started a controversial campaign to reduce the emphasis on sports at Yale and other Ivy League schools. The society disbanded in the 1960s.

Torch Honor Society was reestablished as a secret society for seniors in 1995. The re-established society originally met on the 4th floor of Sheffield-Sterling-Strathcona Hall (SSS), across from Aurelian Honor Society, but was banned from this space for damaging university property in 2005. It now meets off campus in the Yale-China Association building on Temple Street.

== Symbols ==
The society's badge consists of an uplifted torch, representing devotion to its ideals and its allegiance to Yale University's motto Lux et Veritas (Light and Truth). The torch is backed by a broad circle that represents comradeship and equality in mutual endeavors. On top of the torch is the Roman numeral X, representing the original ten members.

The society's motto is Simus Lux Obscuro in Mundo or "Let us be Light in a Dark World".

== Members ==
Historically, Torch selected or tapped a delegation of ten juniors each spring. Because it was an honor society, Torch could tap members of other societies or fraternities. The society occasionally selected Yale faculty or graduates for honorary membership.

After its reformation in the 1990s, the society started selecting sixteen members for each delegation during "Tap Night" with the other secret societies.

== Notable alumni ==
- William F. Buckley Jr. – author and commentator
- George H. W. Bush – former president of the United States
- Raymond C. Clevenger – judge
- Harry B. Combs – aviation pioneer, airplane manufacturer, and author
- Bradford Dillman – actor
- William H. Donaldson – former United States Under Secretary of State
- William Henry Draper III – venture capitalist
- Alfred Whitney Griswold – historian and educator
- William Rogers Herod – president of International General Electric Company and vice president of General Electric
- Robert Maynard Hutchins – president and chancellor of the University of Chicago and dean of Yale Law School
- Carl Kaestle – historian
- Tony Lavelli – professional basketball player
- Irving S. Olds – lawyer
- William C. Plunkett – politician
- Cyrus Vance – United States Deputy Secretary of Defense, Secretary of the Army, and General Counsel of the Department of Defense

== See also ==
- List of collegiate secret societies
