= Catherine Cavagnaro =

American mathematician and aviator

Catherine Elizabeth Cavagnaro (born 1965) is an American mathematician and aviator. She is a professor of mathematics at Sewanee: The University of the South, specializing in geometric topology and combinatorial group theory, and is co-editor of the Dictionary of Classical and Theoretical Mathematics. She is also a former record-holder in consecutive spins of an airplane, has been repeatedly recognized by the General Aviation Awards Program for her contributions to flight safety and instruction, and is listed in the Tennessee Aviation Hall of Fame.

== Early life and family background ==
Cavagnaro was one of three daughters of Louis Cavagnaro (1927–2014), a descendant of Italian immigrants who grew up in the Yosemite Valley and became a builder of dish antennae including the Stanford Dish. Her mother, Catherine Mary Kickham, was originally from Kilkenny, Ireland; her parents settled in California's Santa Clara Valley and later founded a Celtic goods store there.

== Education and academic career ==
Cavagnaro received a bachelor of science in mathematics from Santa Clara University in 1987 and her PhD in mathematics at the University of Illinois Urbana-Champaign in 1995. Her doctoral dissertation, A Homotopy Reciprocity Law for Ribbon Disc Complements, concerned homotopy in low-dimensional topology, and was supervised by Robert F. Craggs. In it, she credits Paul Halmos for, as she puts it, ordering her to go to graduate school.

Meanwhile, she joined the mathematics faculty of Sewanee: The University of the South in 1993. She has served as chair of the mathematics department at Sewanee, and introduced mathematics courses relating to her aviation interests, on topics including aerodynamics and the use of differential equations to model physical phenomena.

In 2001, Cavagnaro and William T. Haight II co-edited the Dictionary of Classical and Theoretical Mathematics, published by the CRC Press as the third volume of their Comprehensive Dictionary of Mathematics book series.

== Aviation ==
As a mathematics student, Cavagnaro loved to watch airplanes while doing her homework, and dreamed of flying but was unable to afford the lessons. She finally took up flying in 1999, while on a sabbatical after earning tenure at Sewanee; her initial lessons were a tenth-anniversary gift from her husband. She became a certified flight instructor in 2001, and became specialized in flight aerobatics after training with "spin doctor" William K. Kershner. Cavagnaro's planes have included a Cessna 152 Aerobat, a Beechcraft Bonanza, and a Piper Cherokee 140.

Kershner held the record for consecutive turns in a flat spin in an aircraft, with 25 turns; Cavagnaro broke it by performing 60 consecutive turns in her Cessna, and filmed the results to document the fact that the spin recovery technique does not change after larger numbers of turns. Subsequently, Spencer Suderman performed even more consecutive turns, with 81 in 2014 and 98 in 2016.

From 2004 to 2008 she was a visiting professor of aviation systems at the University of Tennessee Space Institute, working as a test pilot to study the stability under icing of a de Havilland Canada DHC-6 Twin Otter owned by NASA. She runs the Ace Aerobatic School in Sewanee, Tennessee, is a regular columnist for the Aircraft Owners and Pilots Association, and is a designated examiner for the Federal Aviation Administration.

Cavagnaro was a 2005 winner of the Amelia Earhart Memorial Scholarship Awards of the Ninety-Nines. In the General Aviation Awards Program, Cavagnaro was named the 2018 National FAA Safety Team Representative of the Year, and 2020 National Certificated Flight Instructor of the Year. She was named to the Tennessee Aviation Hall of Fame in 2018. Her biography was one of nine stories of women aviators included in the 2008 book A Hunger for the Sky by Sparky Barnes.
