= Longmont Fire Department Station 1 =

- Longmont Fire Department
- U.S. National Register of Historic Places
- U.S. Historic district – Contributing property
- Colorado State Register of Historic Properties
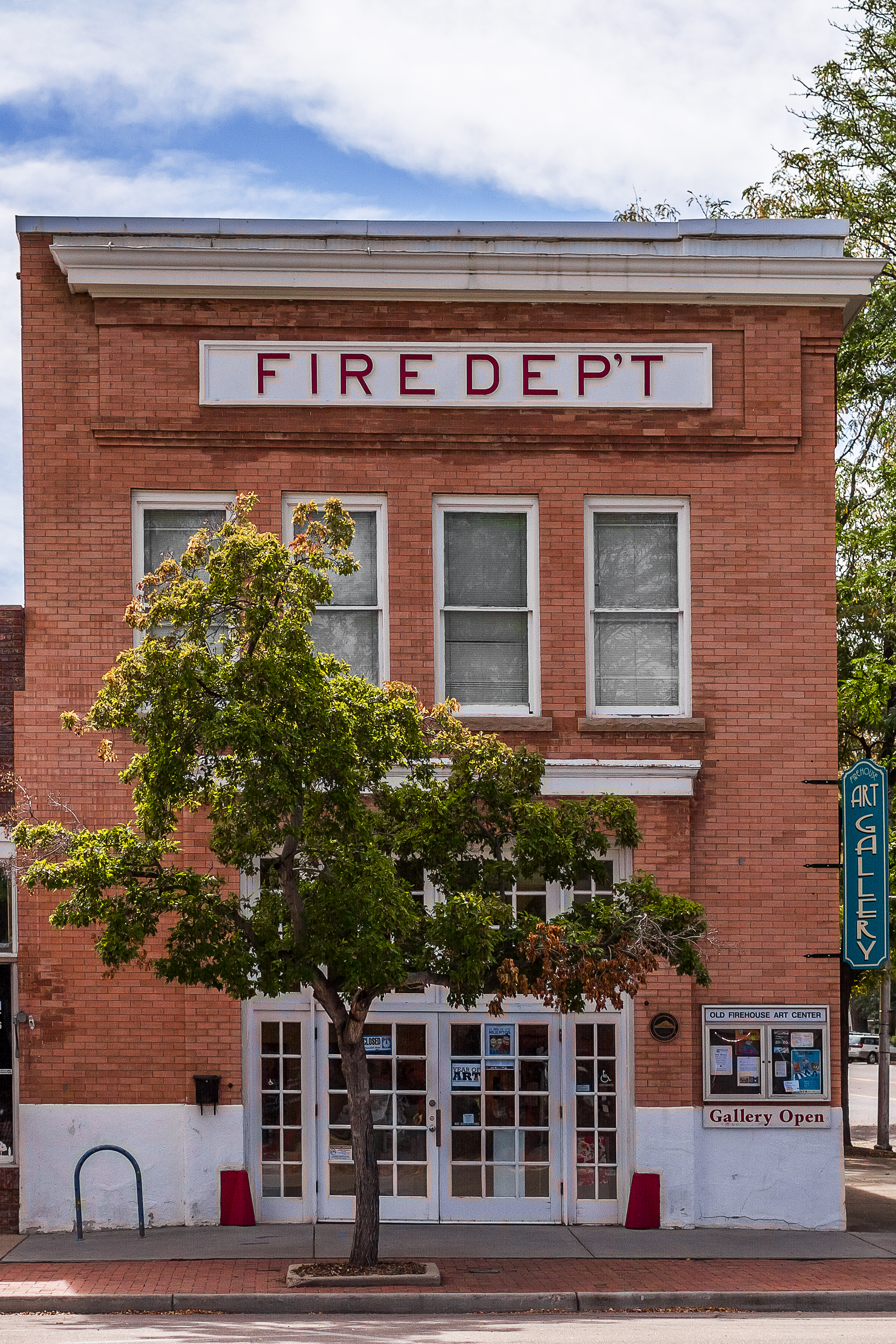
- Front of the station

- Location within Colorado Location within the United States
- Location: 667 4th Ave., Longmont, Colorado
- Coordinates: 40°9′56″N 105°6′10″W
- Area: 0.1 acres (0.040 ha)
- Built: 1907
- Built by: E.C. Cauble
- Architect: B.C. Viney
- Architectural style: Chicago
- Part of: Downtown Longmont Historic District (ID100001501)
- NRHP reference No.: 85001063
- CSRHP No.: 5BL.281

Significant dates
- Added to NRHP: May 16, 1985
- Designated CP: August 28, 2017

The Longmont Fire Department Station 1 is a former fire station in Longmont, Colorado, United States. Constructed in 1907, it remained in use as a fire station until 1971. The fire station is owned by the City of Longmont but is now leased to the Firehouse Art Center.

In 1985, the station was listed on the National Register of Historic Places as Longmont Fire Department, qualifying because of its place in local history. It was included as a contributing building in the designation of the Downtown Longmont Historic District in 2017.

In 1884, Longmont hung its fire department bell atop their first fire station located at 4th/Coffman. This bell, said to have cost $211, alerted the Longmont community of an emergency. In 1907, the first fire station was torn down to make room for the second station built in the same location in 1908. When the Terry St./11th firehouse was designed (currently Longmont Fire Station #1), the front was designed to mimic the front of the fire house on 4th/Coffman. Because of this design, the new fire house was able to house the early 1900 fire pole and bell once used to get early firefighters from the second floor to the street level.
