= Society of Aviation and Flight Educators =

The Society of Aviation and Flight Educators (SAFE) is a professional organization open to all aviation educators, including flight instructors, ground instructors, academicians, and others who have an interest in aviation education. Founded in Connecticut in early 2009, SAFE "facilitates the professional development of aviation educators [and] seeks to create a safer aviation environment through enhanced education." SAFE is governed by a board of directors composed of nine members, all of whom are elected by the SAFE membership in a rotating three-year cycle.

In 2011 SAFE transformed the flight training system in the United States with the GA Pilot Training Reform Symposium. This meeting attracted users, partners and major FAA officials including FAA Administrator Randy Babbitt and led to extensive changes in FAA guidance and policy. One significant outcome of this symposium was the introduction of the Airman Testing Standards (ACS) in June 2016. This revolutionary change introduced the third pillar of flight safety, risk management, into the previous skill and knowledge test requirements of the Practical Test Standards (PTS). The ACS also integrated the knowledge and flight testing components into a more efficient and valid evaluation formatted into a real-life scenario structure.

SAFE has signed letters of understanding with a number of organizations, including Cessna Aircraft Company and the FAA Safety Team. SAFE is also a sponsor of the General Aviation Awards Program. The organization is proactive on issues that affect aviation educators and has partnered with others to develop a mentoring program for aviation educators. In July 2010, SAFE launched a flight instructor liability insurance program developed for its member-instructors. In November 2010, SAFE announced plans to chair the GA Pilot Training Reform Symposium.

Since 2021, SAFE is the home for the Master Instructor Program, which is a family of accreditations available to qualified aviation educators based on a system of advanced professional standards and rigorous peer review.
