= Flight instructor =

Person who teaches others to operate aircraft

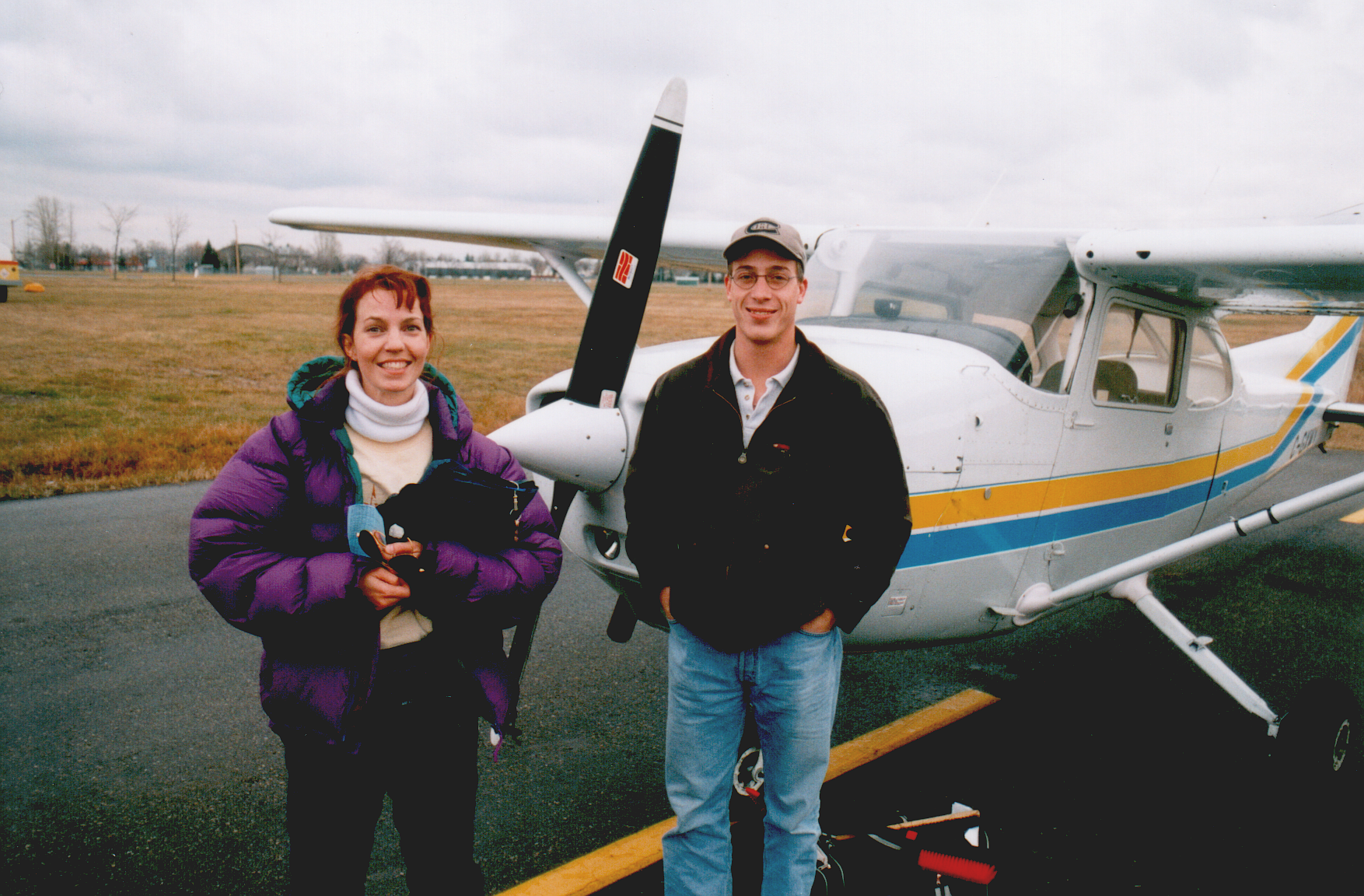
A flight instructor (left) and her student, with their Cessna 172

A flight instructor is a person who teaches others to operate aircraft. Specific privileges granted to holders of a flight instructor qualification vary from country to country, but very generally, a flight instructor serves to enhance or evaluate the knowledge and skill level of an aviator in pursuit of a higher pilot's license, certificate or rating.

== United States ==
=== Privileges ===
A person who holds a flight instructor certificate (called a "certificated flight instructor" (CFI) is authorized to give training and endorsements required for and relating to:

- a student, private, commercial or other pilot certificate;
- the three hours of training with reference only to instruments in preparation for a private pilot certificate. Note that this does not need to be a CFII.
- an instrument rating, only if the CFI has an instrument instructor rating (CFII); This cannot be given by a "safety pilot". A safety pilot can only be used to help maintain instrument proficiency with an instrument-rated pilot by flying the required six instrument approaches-holding-intercepting and tracking courses, within the preceding six calendar months.
- flight review, an endorsement previously called biennial flight review (currently referred to as flight review see 14 CFR part 61.56), or recency of experience requirement;
- preparation for a practical test (typically three hours within the preceding 60 days in preparation for a certificate or rating); or endorsement for a knowledge test (written examination)

Certain limitations are placed on the instruction a flight instructor may give. For example, flight instructors wishing to train applicants for a flight instructor certificate must have held their own flight instructor certificate for at least 24 months and must have given at least 200 hours of instruction. Specific training programs have additional requirements or limitations. The occupational privileges of instructors employed by flight schools regulated under 14 CFR parts 141 and 142 are further restricted. Specific authorization is often required from the local controlling agency (Typically the flight standards district office) in order for instructors to conduct evaluations, for example.

=== Eligibility requirements ===
Flight instructors in the United States must hold at least a commercial pilot certificate. Individuals wishing to give instruction in airplanes or powered-lift aircraft are additionally required to hold an instrument rating in the desired category and class. Holders of a sport pilot certificate (or higher) may obtain a flight instructor certificate with sport pilot rating, allowing them to give instruction for the sport pilot certificate in light-sport aircraft.

All individuals desiring flight instructor privileges must pass two additional written exams (fundamentals of instruction, or FOI; and a knowledge test specific to the category of aircraft in which instructional privileges are desired, such as fixed-wing) as well as a practical test. Flight instructors must be at least 18 years of age to be eligible. Those airmen who hold commercial privileges in lighter-than-air aircraft (balloons and airships) have flight instructor privileges in those category and classes they have on their pilot certificate. Lighter-than-air flight instructor privileges do not get placed on a flight instructor certificate.

=== Training requirements ===
Normally when a CFI applicant begins training, they are required to build a series of CFI lesson plans. These plans use many of the principles that a CFI applicant learns during Fundamentals of Instruction (FOI) Training. The CFI will spend hundreds of hours compiling data from various sources that cover all of the FAA required subject areas. Those subject areas are all listed below:

- Fundamentals of Instruction
  - The Learning Process
  - Human Behavior and Effective Communication
  - The Teaching Process
  - Teaching Methods
  - Critique and Evaluation
  - Flight Instructor Characteristics and Responsibilities
  - Planning Instructional Activity
- Technical Subject Areas
  - Aeromedical Factors
  - Visual Scanning and Collision Avoidance
  - Principles of Flight
  - Airplane Flight Controls
  - Airplane Weight and Balance
  - Navigation and Flight Planning
  - Night Operations
  - High Altitude Operations
  - Federal Aviation Regulations and Publications
  - National Airspace System
  - Navigation Systems and Radar Services
  - Logbook Entries and Certificate Endorsements
- Preflight Preparation
  - Certificates and Documents
  - Weather Information
  - Operation of Systems
  - Performance and Limitations
  - Airworthiness Requirements 3-46
- Preflight Procedures
- Airport Operations
- Takeoff, Landings, and Go-Arounds
- Fundamentals of Flight
- Performance Maneuvers
- Ground Reference Maneuvers
- Slow Flight, Stalls, and Spins
- Basic Instrument Maneuvers
- Emergency Operations

=== Professional organizations ===
In the United States, two professional organizations represent flight instructors nationally:

- Society of Aviation and Flight Educators (SAFE)
- National Association of Flight Instructors (NAFI)

=== Awards ===
The Gold Seal Flight Instructor is a prestigious award given by the Federal Aviation Administration (FAA) to Certified Flight Instructors (CFIs) who demonstrate excellence in flight instruction. The Gold Seal is awarded to CFIs who maintain a high standard of performance and instructional effectiveness.

== India ==
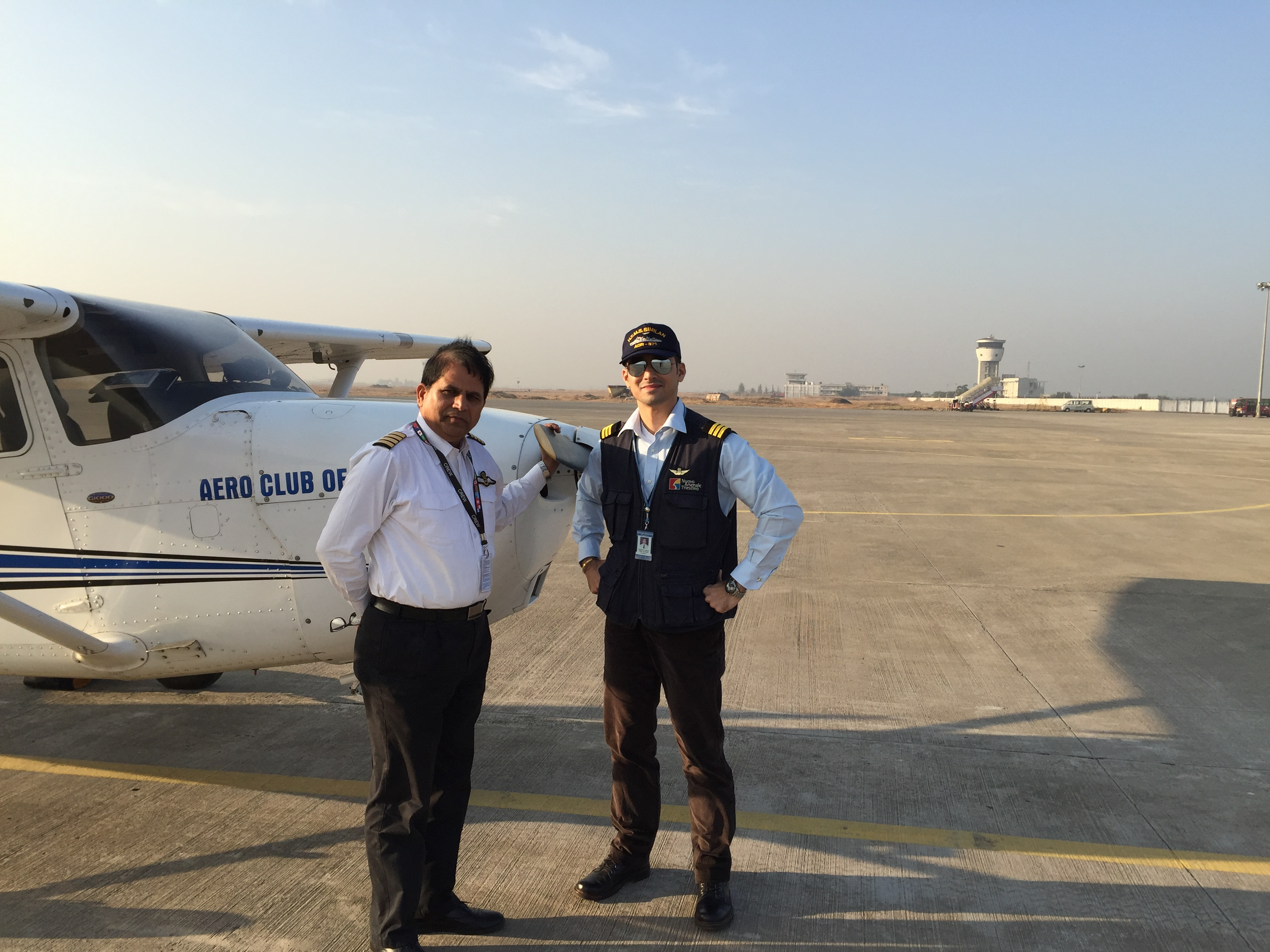
A Chief Flying Instructor and Commercial Pilot at Surat Airport in India showing variation in pilot uniforms

In India there are three grades of flight instructors:

- Assistant Pilot Instructor (API)
- Pilot Instructor (PI)
- Chief Flying Instructor (CFI)

A Pilot Instructor In-Charge (PII) and Deputy CFI (Dep.CFI) are variations of the PI and CFI ranks respectively, but they essentially hold the same certificate / rating issued by Directorate General of Civil Aviation (DGCA). Typically, an API, PI and PII wear three-bar epaulets and a Dep.CFI and CFI wear four-bar epaulets.

== Europe ==
In Europe under the European Union Aviation Safety Agency (EASA) regulatory system there are several different types of ratings for flight instruction. These instructor rating can be issued for different categories of aircraft: Airplane, Helicopter, Balloon or Sailplane, e.g. a helicopter flight instructor holds a FI(H).

This section only covers the aeroplane instructor ratings.

Flight Instructor (FI) teaches basic flight instruction towards a license (PPL or LAPL), and may instruct in 'difference training' for different types of add-on endorsements, e.g. tail wheel or retractable gear.

A FI may also hold the privileges from any other instructor rating such as IRI or CRI, as well as other instructor privileges such as CPL, Night or Aerobatics.

Instrument Rating Instructor (IRI) teaches instrument flying towards an instrument rating under a modular program.

Class Rating Instructor (CRI) instructs on a certain class of aircraft towards a class rating for those who already hold a license. Class ratings may include Single Engine Piston Land (SEPL), Multi Engine Piston Land (MEPL), Single or Multi Engine Piston Sea, or Single Engine Turboprop under a modular program.

== Canada ==
This section currently covers only the aeroplane flight instructor ratings.

In Canada, the holder of a commercial pilot licence or airline transport pilot licence may have their licence endorsed with a flight instructor rating - aeroplane. Initially, the pilot is endorsed as a "Class 4" flight instructor. This allows the pilot to deliver flight training towards the issuance of a recreational pilot permit, private pilot licence, commercial pilot licence, night rating, and VFR over-the-top rating. The "Class 4" flight instructor may only conduct training while under the supervision of a "Class 2" or "Class 1" flight instructor.

After satisfying certain requirements (satisfactory flight test records, experience requirements, written exams, and flight tests), an instructor can upgrade their rating to a Class 3, Class 2, and Class 1 instructor rating. The Class 3 flight instructor does not require the supervision of a Class 2 or Class 1 flight instructor. The Class 2 flight instructor may supervise Class 4 flight instructors and act as the chief flight instructor (CFI) of a flight training unit. The Class 1 flight instructor may give ground school and flight training towards the endorsement of a flight instructor rating.

In order to give instruction towards the instrument rating, multi rating, type ratings, and class conversions (for example, land plane to sea plane), an instructor rating is not necessarily required. The requirements may be limited to holding a commercial or airline transport license and having met certain experience levels (such as time on type and in class). In the case of an instrument rating, the holder of a flight instructor rating can teach it even if they do not have the experience level required for non-flight instructors. Details are contained in the Canadian Aviation Regulations, parts 401 and 421.

== New Zealand ==
Flight instructors in New Zealand must have a Category A, B, C, D or E flight instructor rating.

The Category E rating is specifically for conducting agricultural (top dressing, etc.) flying instruction. Category D flight instructor may conduct type ratings for any aircraft for which they hold a type rating. Category C flight instructors cannot send students on their first solo, and must operate under the supervision of a Category A or B flight instructor.

The chief flying instructor (CFI) is the flying instructor responsible for all flight training at an organisation.

== South Africa ==
In South Africa, Grade III, II and I instructor categories exist. Ratings for aeroplanes and helicopters are obtained and revalidated separately.

A Grade III instructor rating is an entry-level qualification, allowed to provide basic instruction toward the issue of a Private Pilot Licence (PPL) under supervision of a Grade I or Grade II flight instructor. A Grade III instructor must hold at least a Commercial Pilot Licence (CPL) in the same category.

A Grade II instructor requires at least 200 hours of instruction experience, and can function without supervision in most types of training (instrument, night, commercial, multi-engine etc.). Grade II instructors have some examiner privileges, specifically for PPL initial and revalidation tests and can be appointed as Chief Flight Instructors.

A Grade I instructor requires at least 1500 hours of instruction experience, and can provide any type of training on classes and types of aircraft on which the instructor is rated. A Grade I instructor is also eligible for appointment as a Class 1 Designated Flight Examiner (DFE-I).

A DFE-I can issue and renew any licences and ratings that he or she is rated for. The appointment is renewed annually. Most DFE-Is are employed by major airlines.

There is also a parallel system, not in compliance with ICAO guidelines, for recreational pilots. This training takes place under Part 62 of the Civil Aviation Regulations. Such instructor ratings come in Category A, B and C, with A being the most senior.

== See also ==
- Pilot licensing and certification
- Ground Instructor
- Bárány chair
