= Stephen Wolf =

American businessman (born 1941)

Stephen M. Wolf
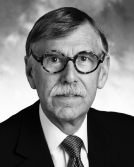
- Wolf, 2012
- Born: 1941 (age 84–85); California, United States
- Education: San Francisco State University
- Occupations: Chairman of R.R. Donnelley & Sons Company; Managing partner to Alpilles, LLC
- Spouse(s): Delores Wallace (1986-present)

Stephen M. Wolf (born in 1941) is an American business executive in the aviation sector. He has held leadership positions at various companies including chairman of R. R. Donnelley & Sons Company, from March 2004, and managing partner of Alpilles LLC since April 2003. He has also been associated with Lehman Brothers Merchant Banking, and later Trilantic Capital Partners since April 2009.

== Personal life ==
Wolf is a California native who attended high school in Oakland, California, and later earned his bachelor's degree from San Francisco State University. In 1986, he married Delores, a former American Airlines executive.(subscription required) While chairman of United Airlines, the couple resided in Chicago.

In 2013, the couple purchased a 242 square meter (2,600 square feet) Moroccan-style, 2-bedroom condominium in the Dunster House complex at 360 S. Ocean Blvd. in Palm Beach, Florida.

Wolf has a collection of Jaguar automobiles.

Since 1990, Wolf has donated over $19,000 to Republican political campaigns, including those of John McCain, Thomas M. Davis, Sue Lowden, Lauch Faircloth, Linda Lingle, Josh Mandel, Lynn Morley Martin, Michael Castle, and John Warner.

== Career ==
In 1966, Wolf began his aviation career with American Airlines, where he advanced to the position of vice president of the Western Division. In 1981, he joined Pan American World Airways as a senior vice president. In 1982, he became president and chief operating officer of Continental Airlines.

In 1984, he became president and CEO of Republic Airlines (1979-1986), staying in that role until 1986, when he led the airline's merger with Northwest Airlines. He later was chairman and CEO of Tiger International Inc. and its subsidiary, Flying Tiger Line. The company was later acquired by FedEx.

In 1987, Wolf left Flying Tiger to lead Allegis Corporation, the former parent company of United Airlines.

Wolf was on the board of directors for R. R. Donnelley & Sons Company, Philip Morris International, and Chrysler Group, LLC. He is also an honorary trustee of the Brookings Institution.

Since August 1994, Wolf has worked in various roles within the aviation industry. He was a senior advisor to Lazard Frères until its employees purchased the company. From 1987 to July 1994, he was chairman and chief executive officer of UAL Corporation and United Airlines, Inc.

Wolf was the CEO of US Airways from January 1996, until his resignation in November 1998. During this period, the airline changed its name from US Air to US Airways. The company also placed an order for 400 Airbus A320-series narrow-body aircraft, including 120 firm orders at the time of signing

In November 2001, Wolf succeeded Rakesh Gangwal as CEO of US Airways, a position he had previously held before passing it to Gangwal three years earlier. By August 2002, US Airways had filed for Chapter 11 bankruptcy and David N. Siegel was named president and chief executive.

Business positions
Preceded by	CEO of UAL Corporation; 1987 – July 1994	Succeeded by Gerald Greenwald
