= National Association of Flight Instructors =

The National Association of Flight Instructors (NAFI) is a nonprofit professional and educational organisation for flight instructors based in the United States. Founded in 1967 by Jack Eggspuehler, a professor of aviation at Ohio State University, NAFI is dedicated exclusively to "raising and maintaining the professional standing of the flight instructor in the aviation community." NAFI was affiliated with the Experimental Aircraft Association (EAA) from 1995 until 2010. NAFI is governed by a thirteen-member board of directors. The organisation works with other groups such as AOPA, EAA, and the Federal Aviation Administration. Karen Kalishek currently serves as Chair.

In 1997, NAFI completed development of its Master CFI, program. The first person designated by NAFI as a Master CFI was Greg Brown, a well known flight instructor, aviation author, and AOPA Pilot magazine editor. Since then, NAFI has expanded the program to include ground instructors as well as flight instructors. In June, 2009, an updated version of the program was approved by the FAA. Master instructor accreditation is valid for two years.
