= General Aviation Awards Program =

General Aviation Awards, Inc.
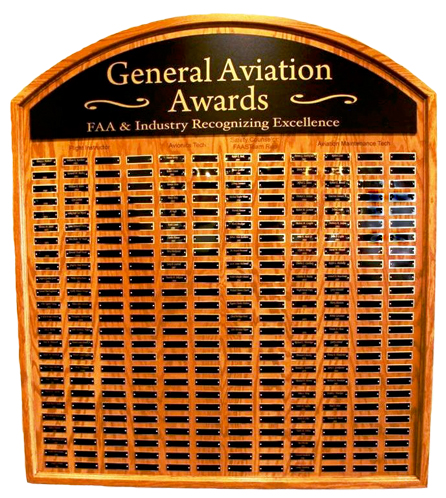
- General Aviation Awards plaque at EAA Museum in Oshkosh, WI
- Founded: 1963 (Incorporated 2014)
- Type: Educational nonprofit 501(c)(3)
- Region served: United States
- Key people: Lauretta Webb, Board Chair
- Volunteers: Six (part-time)
- Website: General Aviation Awards

The General Aviation Awards Program is an American program organized by Federal Aviation Administration (FAA) and a large number of general aviation industry sponsors. The awards, presented annually since 1962, recognize individual general aviation professionals on the local, and national levels for their contributions to aviation, education, and flight safety.

The General Aviation Awards Program is administered by volunteer members of General Aviation Awards, Inc., a nonprofit organization. Awards are presented to professionals in the following fields:

1. Certificated Flight Instructor
2. Aviation Maintenance Technician (AMT)
3. FAASTeam Representative

Candidates are selected based on long-term performance, specific accomplishments and contributions in their specific fields.

District award winners are chosen by industry peers at the more than 100 FAA Flight Standards District Offices (FSDOs) located throughout the United States. Regional award winners are then chosen from among these and announced by representatives of the nine FAA Regional Offices. In July of each year, the three national award recipients are honored in a ceremony at EAA AirVenture in Oshkosh, Wisconsin; traditionally, the awards are presented by the FAA Administrator.

== See also ==
- List of aviation awards
