= Longmont, Colorado =

City in Colorado, United States

- Home rule city
- City of Longmont
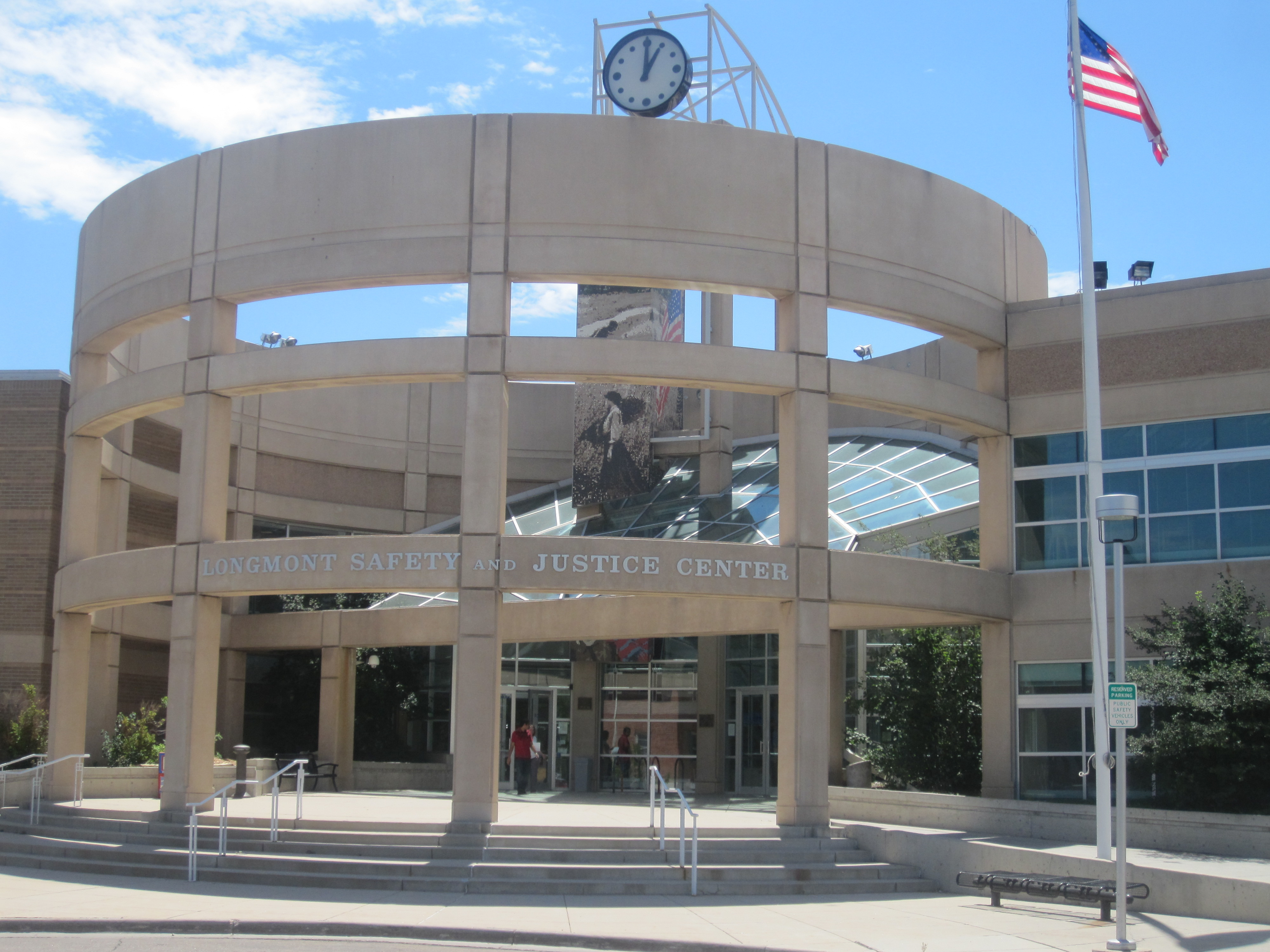
- The Longmont Safety and Justice Center

- Flag

- Location of the City of Longmont in Boulder and Weld counties, Colorado
- Coordinates: 40°09′42″N 105°05′04″W
- Country: United States
- State: Colorado
- Counties: Boulder and Weld
- Founded: 1871
- Incorporated: November 15, 1885
- Named for: Stephen Harriman Long and Longs Peak

Government
  - Type: home rule city
  - Mayor: Susie Hidalgo-Fahring (List)

Area
  - Total: 30.40 sq mi (78.74 km^{2})
  - Land: 28.78 sq mi (74.54 km^{2})
  - Water: 1.64 sq mi (4.26 km^{2})
- Elevation: 4,981 ft (1,518 m)

Population (2020)
  - Total: 98,885
  - Density: 3,440/sq mi (1,327/km^{2})
- Demonym: Longmonster
- Time zone: UTC−07:00 (MST)
  - Summer (DST): UTC−06:00 (MDT)
- ZIP codes: 80501–80504
- Area codes: 303/720/983
- GNIS town ID: 2410869
- FIPS code: 08-45970
- Website: longmontcolorado.gov

Longmont is a home rule city located in Boulder and Weld counties, Colorado, United States. Its population was 98,885 as of the 2020 U.S. census. Longmont is located northeast of the county seat of Boulder. It is named after Longs Peak, a prominent mountain that is clearly visible from the city (mont means "mountain" in French).

== History ==
Indigenous peoples originally inhabited the region, with the Clovis culture representing the earliest documented population to establish settlement in this territory.

Longmont was founded in 1871 by a group of people from Chicago, Illinois. Originally called the Chicago-Colorado Colony, led by president Robert Collyer, the men sold memberships in the town, purchasing the land necessary for the town hall with the proceeds. As the first planned community in Boulder County, the city streets were laid out in a grid plan within a square mile. The Longmont, Colorado Territory, post office opened on April 14, 1873. The city began to flourish as an agricultural community after the Colorado Central Railroad line arrived northward from Boulder in 1877. The Town of Longmont was incorporated on November 15, 1885.

In 1925, the Ku Klux Klan gained control of Longmont's City Council in an election. They began construction of a large pork-barrel project, Chimney Rock Dam, above Lyons and marched up and down Main Street in their costumes. In the 1927 election they were voted out of office, and their influence soon declined. Work on Chimney Rock Dam was abandoned as unfeasible, and its foundations are still visible in the St. Vrain River.

In 1955, United Airlines Flight 629 exploded over Weld County, Colorado, 8 miles east of Longmont, killing 44 passengers and crew.

During the 1960s, the federal government built the Denver Air Route Traffic Control Center in Longmont, and IBM built a manufacturing and development campus near Longmont. Longmont Foods was a turkey processor that once supplied turkey products throughout the United States. For example, turkey hot dogs with the Longmont Foods label were sold throughout the U.S. In 1950 they constructed a large plant on southern Main St. that received trucks full of live turkeys. The company was eventually purchased by Butterball and then closed 2011. As agriculture waned, more high technology has come to the city, including companies like Seagate and Amgen; Amgen closed its Longmont campus in 2015. In April 2009, the GE Energy Company relocated its control solutions business to the area.

The downtown along Main Street, once nearly dead during the 1980s, has seen a vibrant revival in the 1990s and into the 21st century. During the mid-1990s, the southern edge of Longmont became the location of the first New Urbanist project in Colorado, called Prospect New Town, designed by the architects Andrés Duany and Elizabeth Plater-Zyberk.

Longmont was the site of Colorado's first library, founded in 1871 by Elizabeth Rowell Thompson, though it lasted up to a year before its collection of 300 books was lost. Following this, Longmont also was the site of one of Carnegie's libraries with the single-story structure being opened in 1913. It remained open until August 7, 1972, when, due to overcrowding with approximately 22,000 books within the space, it was closed just a week before the new library that had been constructed next door was opened.

In May 2013, the Longmont City Council voted to finance and build out its own municipal gigabit data fiber-optic network, known as NextLight, to every house and business over a three-year period starting in late 2013.

== Geography ==
Longmont is located in northeastern Boulder County and extends eastward into western Weld County. U.S. Highway 287 (Main Street) runs through the center of the city, leading north 16 miles (26 km) to Loveland and south 34 miles (55 km) to downtown Denver. State Highway 119 passes through the city south of downtown and leads southwest 15 miles (24 km) to Boulder and east 5 miles (8 km) to Interstate 25.

The elevation at City Hall is 4,978 feet (1,517 m) above sea level. St. Vrain Creek, a tributary of the South Platte River, flows through the city just south of the city center.

According to the U.S. Census Bureau, Longmont has a total area of 27.6 square miles (71.6 km^{2}), of which 26.2 square miles (67.8 km^{2}) is land and 1.5 square miles (3.8 km^{2}), or 5.30%, is water.

== Climate ==
According to the Köppen Climate Classification system, Longmont has a cold semi-arid climate, abbreviated Bsk on climate maps. The hottest temperature recorded in Longmont was 106 °F (41 °C) on July 7, 1973, and June 27, 1994, while the coldest temperature recorded was −38 °F (−39 °C) on January 16, 1930.

Climate data for Longmont, Colorado, 1991–2020 normals, extremes 1893–present
Month	Jan	Feb	Mar	Apr	May	Jun	Jul	Aug	Sep	Oct	Nov	Dec	Year
Record high °F (°C)	75 (24)	79 (26)	85 (29)	91 (33)	100 (38)	106 (41)	106 (41)	104 (40)	101 (38)	92 (33)	83 (28)	78 (26)	106 (41)
Mean maximum °F (°C)	63.4 (17.4)	67.0 (19.4)	74.8 (23.8)	81.8 (27.7)	89.2 (31.8)	97.2 (36.2)	100.6 (38.1)	97.8 (36.6)	94.0 (34.4)	84.2 (29.0)	72.2 (22.3)	64.3 (17.9)	101.4 (38.6)
Mean daily maximum °F (°C)	44.5 (6.9)	46.8 (8.2)	56.8 (13.8)	63.2 (17.3)	72.7 (22.6)	83.9 (28.8)	90.8 (32.7)	87.8 (31.0)	80.3 (26.8)	66.2 (19.0)	53.5 (11.9)	44.8 (7.1)	65.9 (18.8)
Daily mean °F (°C)	29.4 (−1.4)	32.0 (0.0)	41.5 (5.3)	47.8 (8.8)	57.1 (13.9)	67.2 (19.6)	73.1 (22.8)	70.8 (21.6)	63.0 (17.2)	49.5 (9.7)	38.5 (3.6)	29.6 (−1.3)	50.0 (10.0)
Mean daily minimum °F (°C)	14.4 (−9.8)	17.1 (−8.3)	26.1 (−3.3)	32.3 (0.2)	41.4 (5.2)	50.5 (10.3)	55.4 (13.0)	53.7 (12.1)	45.8 (7.7)	32.9 (0.5)	23.5 (−4.7)	14.5 (−9.7)	34.0 (1.1)
Mean minimum °F (°C)	−8.7 (−22.6)	−3.5 (−19.7)	6.2 (−14.3)	17.0 (−8.3)	30.3 (−0.9)	40.5 (4.7)	48.3 (9.1)	46.3 (7.9)	30.1 (−1.1)	18.6 (−7.4)	3.1 (−16.1)	−7.7 (−22.1)	−15.9 (−26.6)
Record low °F (°C)	−38 (−39)	−36 (−38)	−26 (−32)	−7 (−22)	18 (−8)	29 (−2)	38 (3)	37 (3)	18 (−8)	−5 (−21)	−16 (−27)	−32 (−36)	−38 (−39)
Average precipitation inches (mm)	0.56 (14)	0.57 (14)	1.17 (30)	2.04 (52)	1.97 (50)	1.75 (44)	1.69 (43)	1.95 (50)	1.26 (32)	1.04 (26)	0.75 (19)	0.46 (12)	15.21 (386)
Average snowfall inches (cm)	5.8 (15)	3.8 (9.7)	5.6 (14)	3.1 (7.9)	0.2 (0.51)	0.0 (0.0)	0.0 (0.0)	0.0 (0.0)	0.3 (0.76)	1.1 (2.8)	6.1 (15)	6.2 (16)	32.2 (81.67)
Average precipitation days (≥ 0.01 in)	3.7	4.5	5.1	7.5	10.1	8.3	6.1	7.4	6.3	5.4	4.9	3.0	72.3
Average snowy days (≥ 0.1 in)	2.0	2.4	2.2	1.5	0.3	0.0	0.0	0.0	0.2	0.4	2.2	2.2	13.4
Source 1: National Weather Service (mean maxima and minima 1971–2000)
Source 2: NOAA (average snowfall/snowy days 1981–2010)

== Demographics ==
Historical population
Census	Pop.	Note	%±
1880	773		—
1890	1,543		99.6%
1900	2,201		42.6%
1910	4,256		93.4%
1920	5,848		37.4%
1930	6,029		3.1%
1940	7,406		22.8%
1950	8,099		9.4%
1960	11,489		41.9%
1970	23,209		102.0%
1980	42,942		85.0%
1990	51,555		20.1%
2000	71,093		37.9%
2010	86,270		21.3%
2020	98,885		14.6%
2024 (est.)	99,818	▲	0.9%
U.S. Decennial Census

=== Racial and ethnic composition ===
Longmont, Colorado – Racial and ethnic composition Note: the US Census treats Hispanic/Latino as an ethnic category. This table excludes Latinos from the racial categories and assigns them to a separate category. Hispanics/Latinos may be of any race.
Race / Ethnicity (NH = Non-Hispanic)	Pop 2000	Pop 2010	Pop 2020	% 2000	% 2010	% 2020
White alone (NH)	54,599	59,772	64,916	76.80%	69.28%	65.65%
Black or African American alone (NH)	363	661	900	0.51%	0.77%	0.91%
Native American or Alaska Native alone (NH)	408	413	447	0.57%	0.48%	0.45%
Asian alone (NH)	1,236	2,696	3,490	1.74%	3.13%	3.52%
Pacific Islander alone (NH)	31	40	65	0.04%	0.05%	0.06%
Some Other Race alone (NH)	76	108	514	0.11%	0.13%	.52%
Mixed Race or Multi-Racial (NH)	822	1,389	4,096	1.16%	1.61%	4.14%
Hispanic or Latino (any race)	13,558	21,191	24,457	19.07%	24.56%	24.73%
Total	71,093	86,270	98,885	100.00%	100.00%	100.00%

=== 2020 census ===
As of the 2020 census, Longmont had a population of 98,885 and a population density of 3,436/sq mi (1,327/km^{2}). The median age was 39.1 years. 21.6% of residents were under the age of 18 and 16.2% of residents were 65 years of age or older. For every 100 females there were 98.4 males, and for every 100 females age 18 and over there were 96.2 males age 18 and over.

99.9% of residents lived in urban areas, while 0.1% lived in rural areas.

There were 39,683 households in Longmont, of which 29.5% had children under the age of 18 living in them. Of all households, 46.2% were married-couple households, 19.6% were households with a male householder and no spouse or partner present, and 26.5% were households with a female householder and no spouse or partner present. About 28.2% of all households were made up of individuals and 11.3% had someone living alone who was 65 years of age or older.

There were 41,680 housing units, of which 4.8% were vacant. The homeowner vacancy rate was 0.9% and the rental vacancy rate was 6.7%.

Racial composition as of the 2020 census
Race	Number	Percent
White	70,318	71.1%
Black or African American	999	1.0%
American Indian and Alaska Native	1,246	1.3%
Asian	3,561	3.6%
Native Hawaiian and Other Pacific Islander	79	0.1%
Some other race	10,162	10.3%
Two or more races	12,520	12.7%
Hispanic or Latino (of any race)	24,457	24.7%

== Education ==
Longmont is home to the Boulder County Campus of Front Range Community College, the St. Vrain Valley School District, and to a number of private schools. Longmont is also home to the Master Instructor Continuing Education Program (MICEP) a voluntary accreditation program for aviation educators.

There is also a municipal public library. As of 2019 there was deliberation over whether to establish a library district and to have the library publish news. That year the library's director stated, in the words of Corey Hutchins of the Columbia Journalism Review, "lacks resources and hasn't kept up with the city's growth".

== Transportation ==
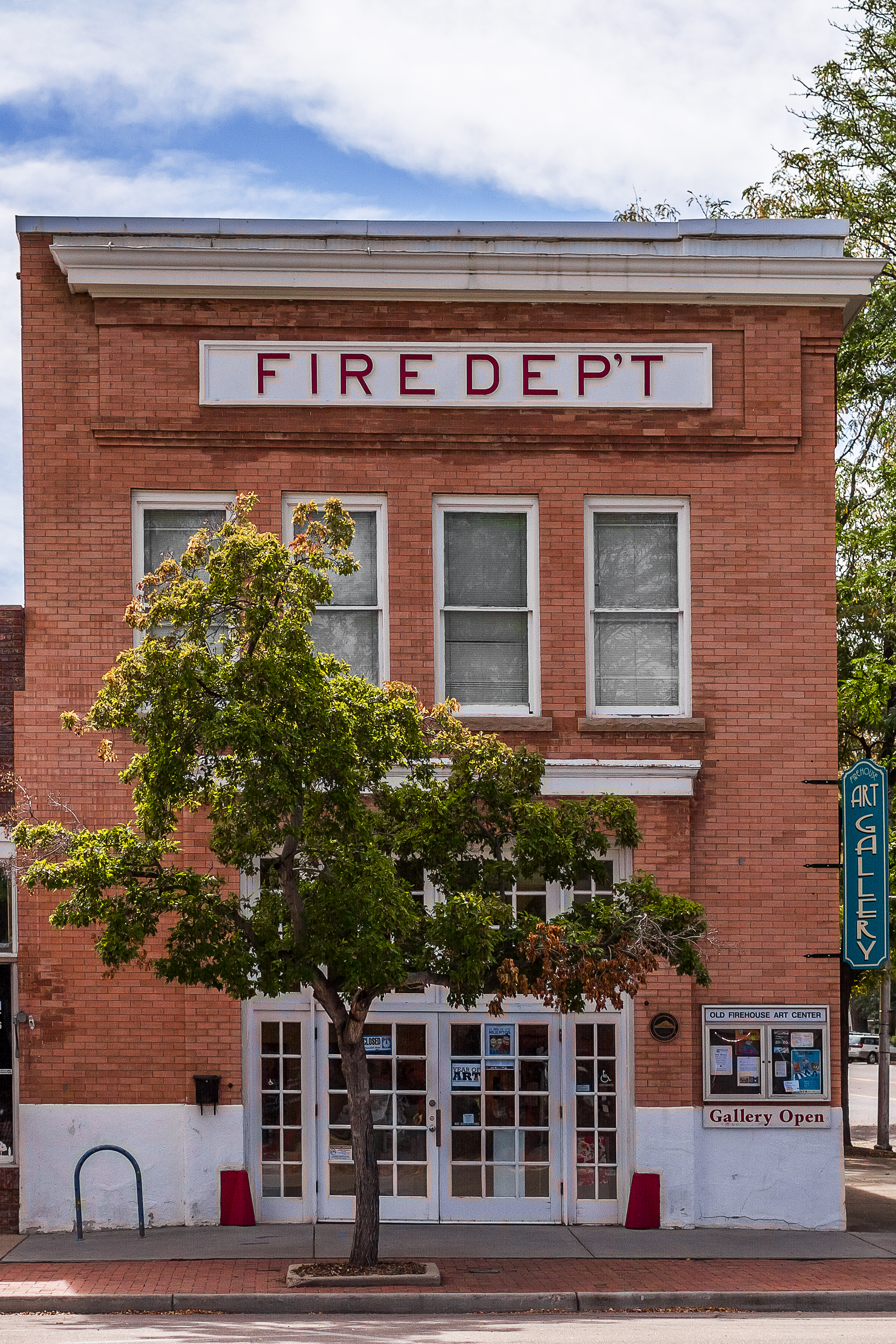
The Longmont Fire Department Station 1 is listed in the National Register of Historic Places.

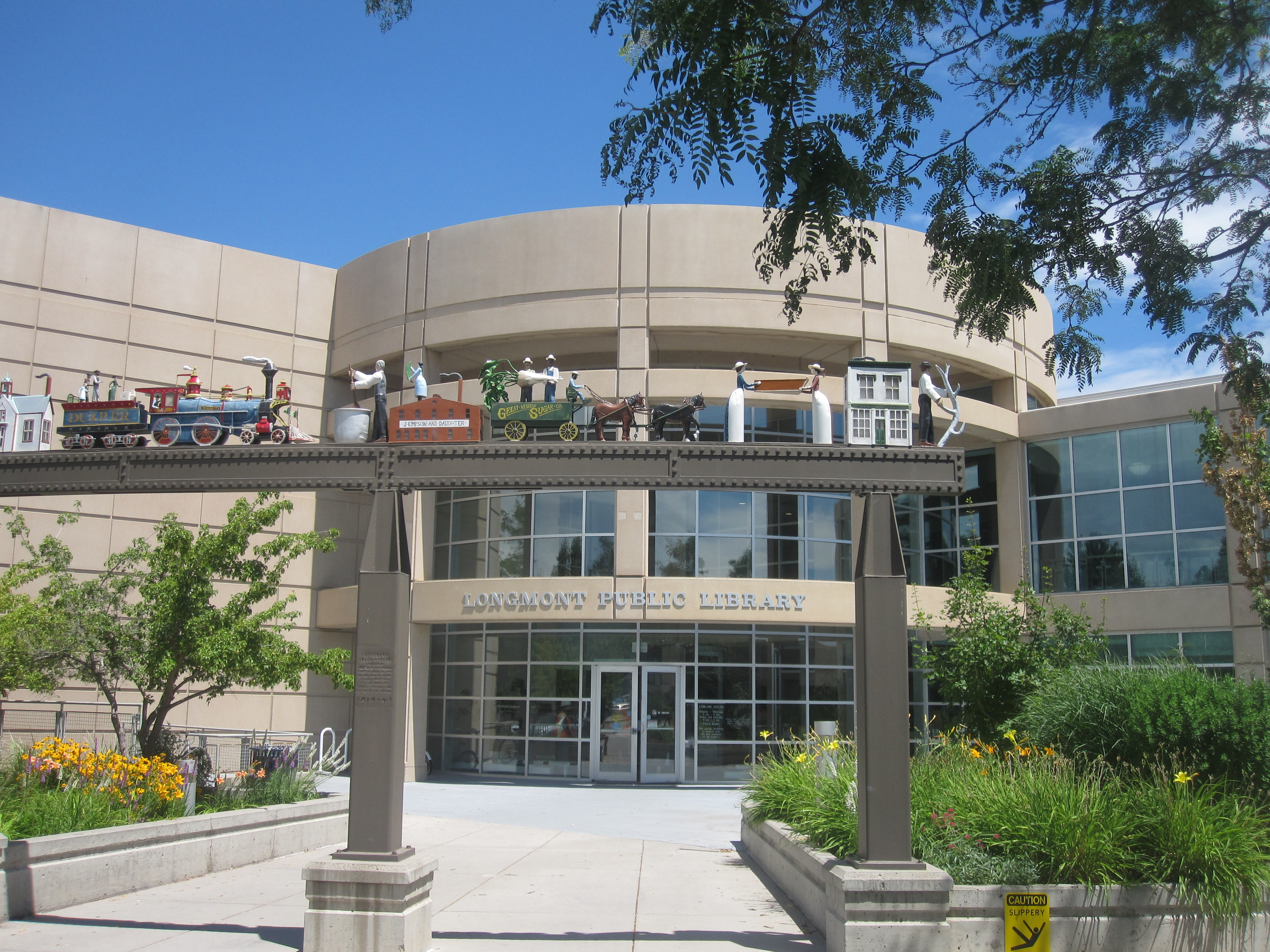
Longmont Public Library

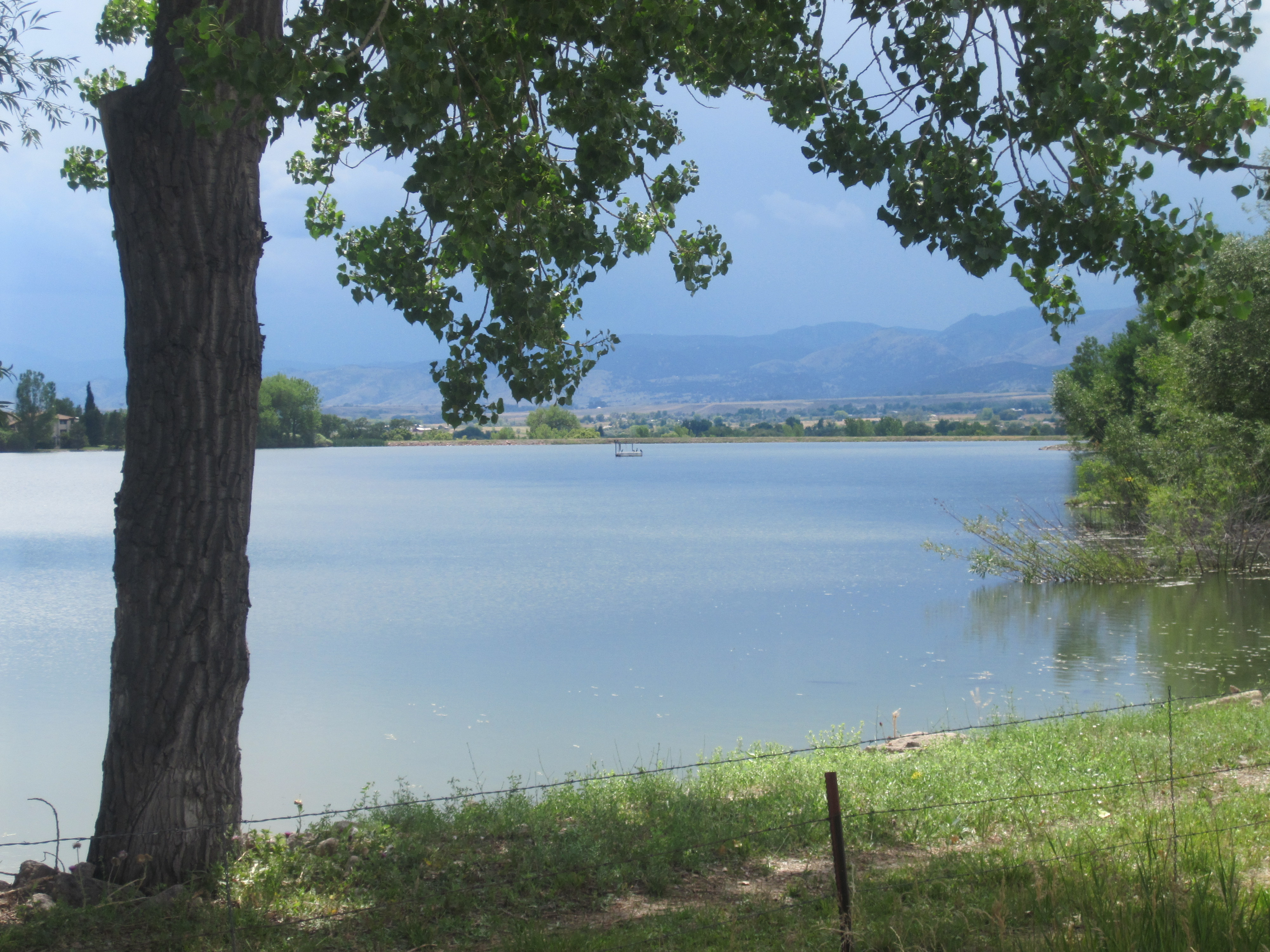
Reservoir west of Longmont

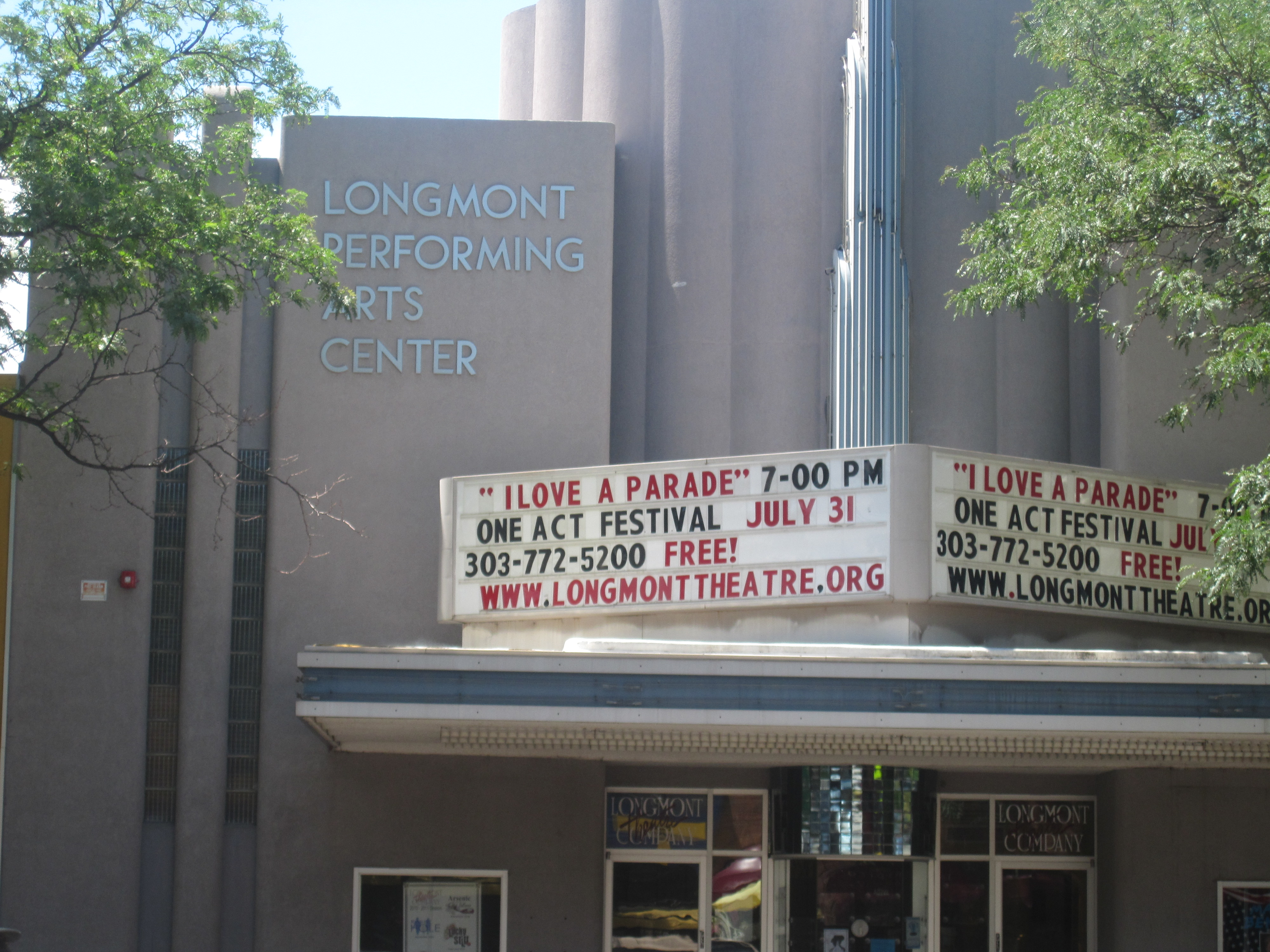
Longmont Performing Arts Center

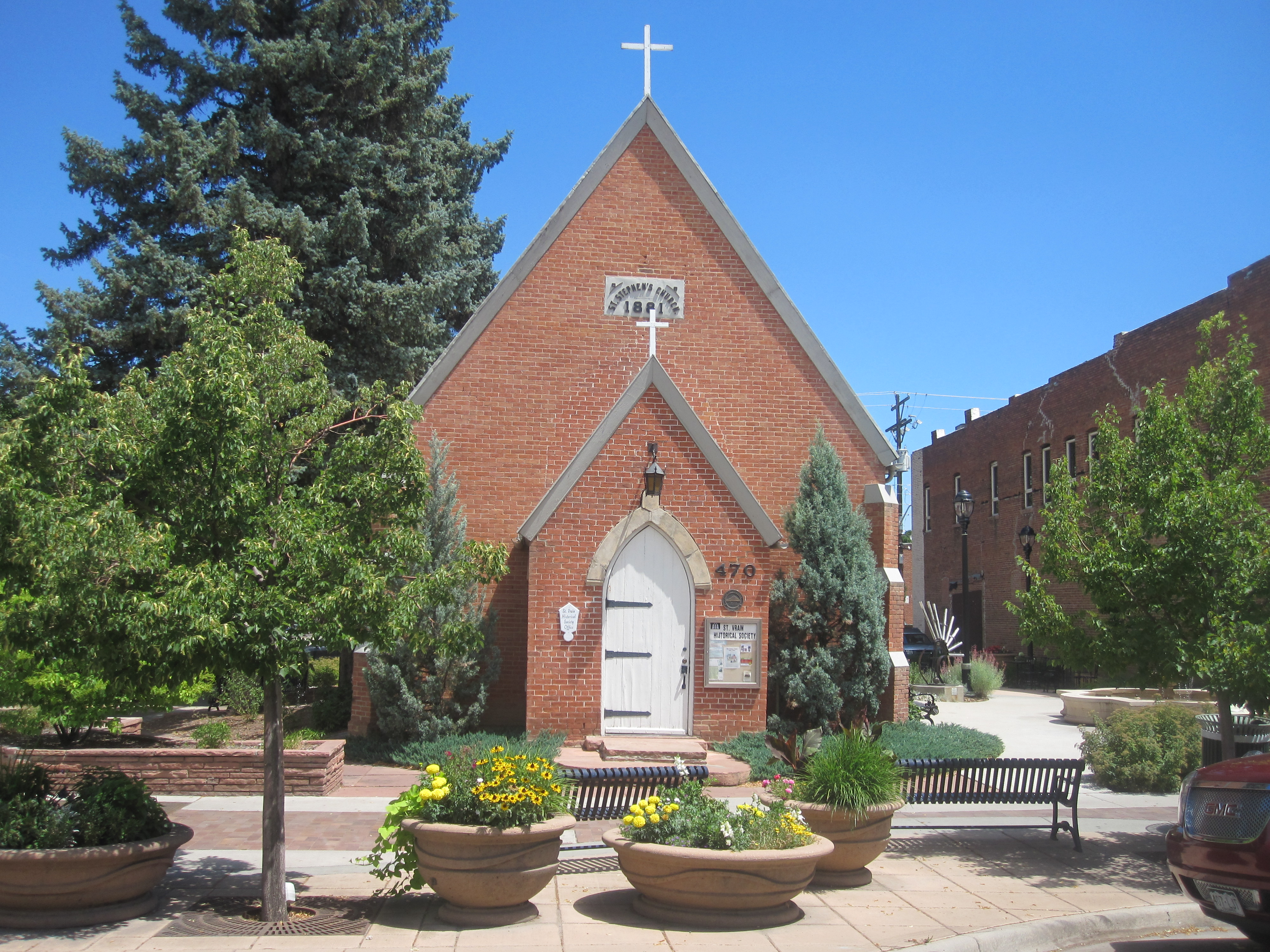
Former St. Stephen's Church (1881) now houses the St. Vrain Historical Society in Longmont.

Longmont has bus service to Denver and Boulder as part of the RTD transit district. Longmont is connected to Fort Collins, Loveland, and Berthoud via a FLEX regional bus service.

As of 2024, the FasTracks project plans to extend RTD's commuter rail B Line to Longmont, which could be completed in the early 2040s.

In 2012, Longmont was recognized by the League of American Bicyclists as a silver-level bicycle-friendly community. Longmont is one of 38 communities in the United States to be recognized with this distinction. It is the only city in Colorado placed at the silver level that is not a major tourist center or a university city.

Vance Brand Airport is a public-use airport owned by the city. It currently has no scheduled passenger flights, but it is popular for general aviation.

== Media ==
The Longmont Leader (formerly the Longmont Observer) is the local daily newspaper.

The Longmont Times-Call, while bearing the city's name, is published from Boulder and is operated by Alden Global Capital of New York City.

Longmont's radio stations include KRCN, KGUD, and KKFN. Sports radio is broadcast on KKSE-FM from a tower about 10 miles (16 km) southeast of Longmont. Also located nearby is KDFD, a Fox News Radio affiliate with a conservative talk format. The KDFD (760 AM) transmitter site is about 15 miles (24 km) east of Boulder.

NPR programming can be heard on Colorado Public Radio stations KCFR from Denver, and KCFC (AM) in Boulder. The NPR affiliate KUNC from the Fort Collins-Greeley market can also be heard in Longmont.

Longmont is also served by Pacifica Radio affiliate KGNU, a non-commercial community radio station from Boulder.

== Economy ==
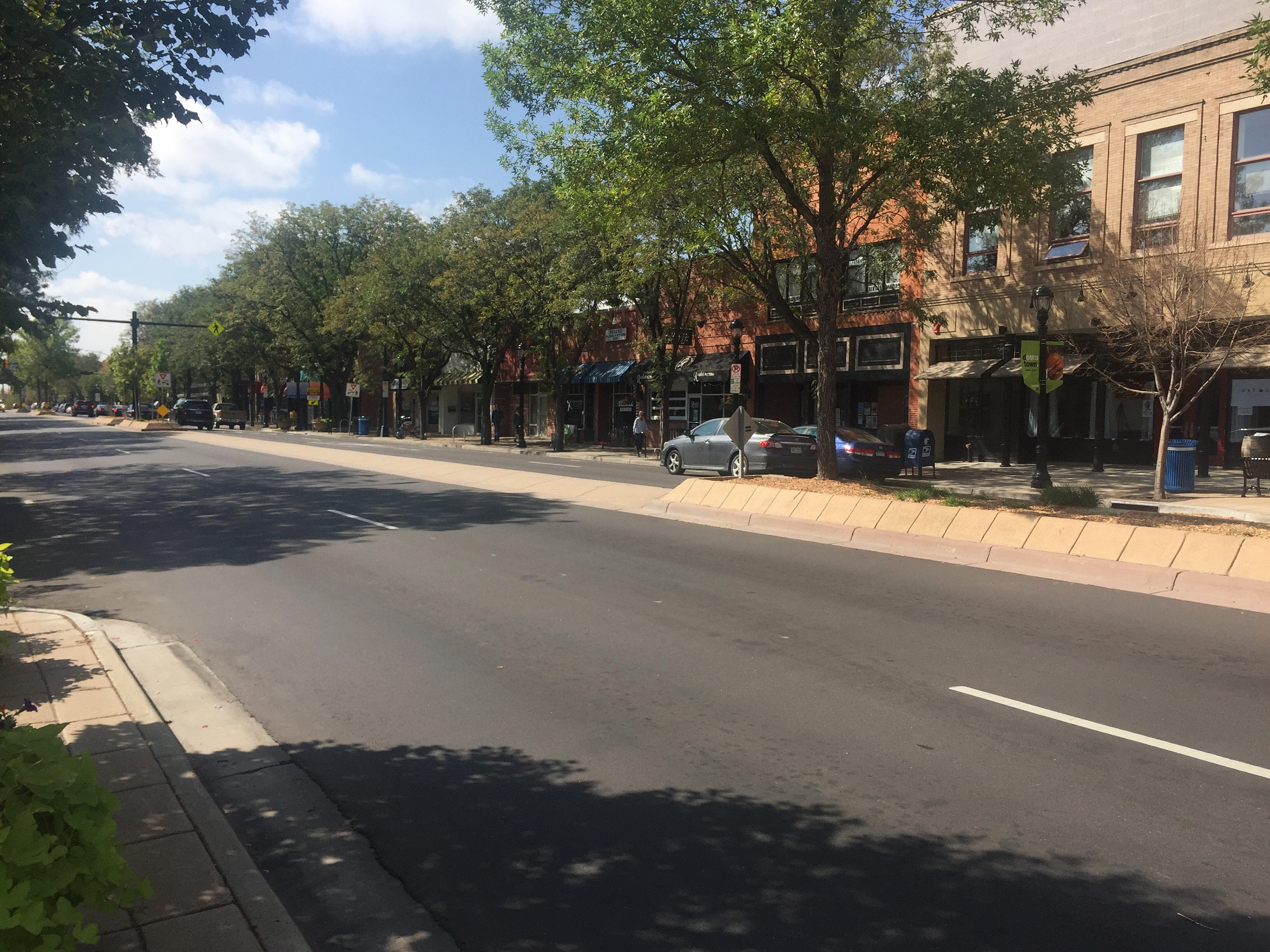
Downtown Longmont is home to many local businesses.

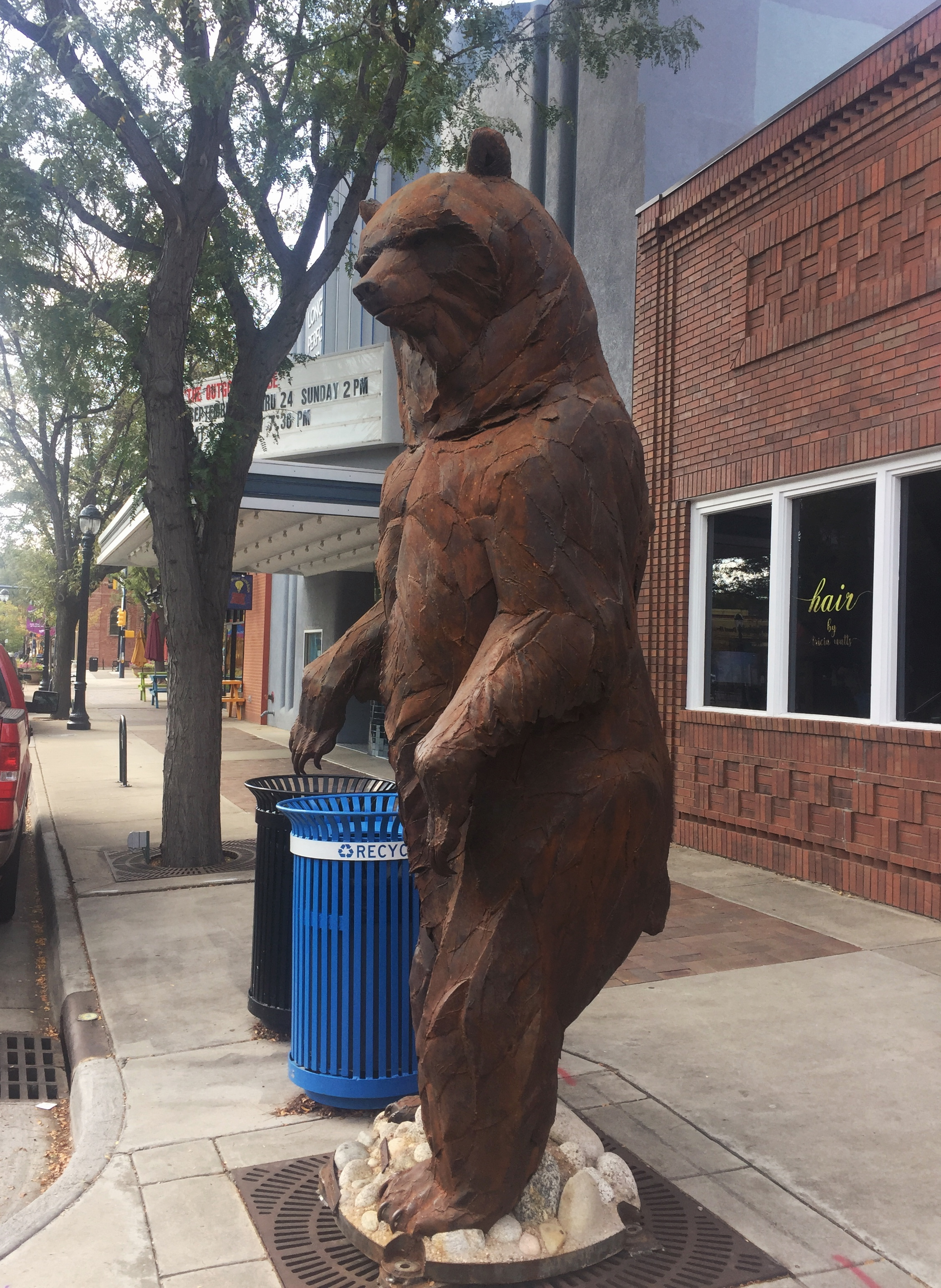
Parker McDonald's "Ursa Major" is part of the City of Longmont's Art in Public Places program.

According to the city's 2020 Annual Comprehensive Financial Report, the top employers in the city are:

#	Employer	# of Employees
1	St. Vrain Valley Schools	3,543
2	City of Longmont	1,625
3	Seagate Technology	1,430
4	Intrado	755
5	Longmont United Hospital	671
6	UC Health Longs Peak Hospital	540
7	McLane Western	460
8	Federal Aviation Administration	422
9	Circle Graphics	400
10	AveXis	354

Longmont's median household income was $89,720 per year in 2022. The largest industries in Longmont as of 2022 are manufacturing (7,188 people); professional, scientific, and technical services (6,533 people); and retail trade (6,066 people).

Due to its proximity to Rocky Mountain National Park, Longmont is home to many hotels, restaurants, and other businesses that cater in part to the tourists visiting the park each year. In addition, Longmont supports a thriving craft brewing industry as well as many recreational and travel-related businesses. Local breweries include two of the nation's largest craft brewers, Left Hand and Oskar Blues, as well as many others. Other businesses support skiing and other snowsports, bicycling, and rock climbing.

Longmont also features a Saturday Farmers Market and is known for its 'maker' community.

== Government ==
Longmont is a home rule municipality. Its current city charter was adopted in 1961, and has been amended numerous times since. Longmont is governed by a seven-member City Council, which consists of the directly-elected mayor of Longmont and six additional councilmembers. Of the six councilmembers, three are elected from one of three wards, and three are elected from the city at-large. The mayor is elected for a term of two years, and each councilmember is elected for a term of four years. Regular city elections in Longmont are held on the first Tuesday in November of odd-numbered years. The officials elected at each regular city election alternate between (1) the mayor, three at-large councilmembers using the single transferable vote and (2) the mayor, three councilmembers from three different wards.

Longmont, Colorado adopted proportional ranked-choice voting for its city council races following two successful 2026 ballot referendums.

Longmont operates under a council-manager system of government, with a city manager acting as the city's chief administrative officer. The city manager is appointed by and serves at the pleasure of the City Council.

This is a list of individuals who have served as mayor of Longmont.

Mayor	Term
L. H. Dickson	1881–1885
George T. Dell	1885–1887
Charles H. Baker	1887–1888
John B. Thompson	1888–1889
Ira L. Herron	1889–1890
Frank Stickney	1890–1892
John A. Buckley	1892–1894
Neil C. Sullivan	1894–1896
George W. Coffin	1896–1897
Willis A. Warner	1897–1898
Frank M. Downer	1898–1899
Frank M. Miller	1899–1901
John A. Donovan	1901–1903
Samuel C. Morgan	1903–1905
Charles A. Bradley	1905–1909
Frank P. Secor	1909–1911
Rae H. Kiteley	1911–1921
James F. Hays	1921–1927
Fred W. Flanders	1927–1929
Earl T. Ludlow	1929–1931
Ray Lanyon	1931–1943
Fred C. Ferguson	1943–1947
George A. Richart	1947–1949
Otto F. Vliet	1949–1957
Richard C. Troxell	1957–1959
Albert Will	1959–1961
Ralph R. Price	1961–1969
Alexander Zlaten	1969–1971 Pro Tem
Wade Gaddis	1971–1973 Pro Tem
Austin P. Stonebreaker	1973–1974
Alvin G. Perenyi	1975–1977
George F. Chandler	1977 Pro Tem
E. George Patterson Jr.	1977–1979
Robert J. Askey	1979–1981
William G. Swenson	1981–1985
Larry Burkhardt	1985–1987
Alvin E. Sweney	1987–1989
Fred Wilson	1989–1993
Leona Stoecker	1993–2001
Julia Pirnack	2001–2007
Roger Lange	2007–2009
Bryan L. Baum	2009–2011
Dennis L. Coombs	2011–2017
Brian Bagley	2017–2021
Joan Peck	2021–2025
Susie Hidalgo-Fahring	2025–Present

=== Federal and state representation ===
In the Colorado House of Representatives, Longmont is split between the 11th and 19th House districts, which are currently represented by Representatives Karen McCormick (D) and Dan Woog (R), respectively. In the Colorado State Senate, Longmont is a part of the 17th Senate district, which is currently represented by Senator Katie Wallace (D), who was selected by a vacancy committee to represent the district following the resignation of former Senator Sonya Jaquez Lewis. At the federal level, Longmont is a part of Colorado's 2nd congressional district, which is currently represented in the United States House of Representatives by Congressman Joe Neguse (D).

=== Fire department ===
The Longmont Fire Department was established in its current form in 1908. The history of the department can be traced back to the creation of the W. A. Buckingham Hook & Ladder Company in 1879.

As of 2020 the department operates from six stations throughout the city. Longmont Fire Department Station 1 was built in 1907, used by the department until 1971, and listed in the National Register of Historic Places in 1985.

== Notable people ==
- Valarie Allman (b. 1995), discus gold medalist in the 2020 Olympics and 2024 Olympics; graduate of Silver Creek High School
- Greg Biekert (b. 1969), American football player and coach; played football for Longmont High School
- David Bote (b. 1993), MLB player; Longmont native
- Vance D. Brand (b. 1931), NASA astronaut; graduate of Longmont High School
- Elizabeth A. Fenn (b. 1959), Pulitzer Prize–winning historian; Longmont resident
- Andrea Gibson (1975–2025), Poet Laureate of Colorado; Longmont resident
- Terry Johnson (b. 1935), engineer and entrepreneur
- John R. Kelso (b. 1831), congressman and author; Longmont resident
- Kody Lostroh (b. 1985), Professional Bull Riders World Champion 2009; Longmont native
- David Pauley (b. 1983), MLB pitcher; graduate of Longmont High School
- Jack Reynor (b. 1992), Irish actor; born in Longmont
- Kristen Schaal (b. 1978), comedian and actress; raised in Longmont
- Dan Simmons (1948-2026), Hugo Award–winning author; Longmont resident
- Kimiko Soldati (b. 1974), diver at the 2004 Olympics; raised in Longmont
- Fred Stone (b. 1873), stage and film actor; lived in Longmont
- William Oxley Thompson (b. 1855), fifth President of The Ohio State University; founder of the short-lived Longmont Presbyterian College
- Alan Wagner (1939-2018), American operatic baritone; Longmont native
- Ed Werder (b. 1960), Dick McCann Award–winning sports reporter; attended Longmont High School

== Sister cities ==
Longmont has established a sister city relationship with:

- Chino, Nagano, Japan
- Ciudad Guzmán, Jalisco, Mexico
- Northern Arapaho Tribe, Wind River Reservation, Wyoming

== See also ==
- Denver-Aurora-Greeley, CO Combined Statistical Area
- Front Range Urban Corridor
- Chivington Drive: the council took the decision to rename the city street following two decades of protests that it honored the soldier who was responsible for the Sand Creek Massacre of 1864.
