= List of museums in Colorado =

Coordinates: 38.9972°N 105.5478°W

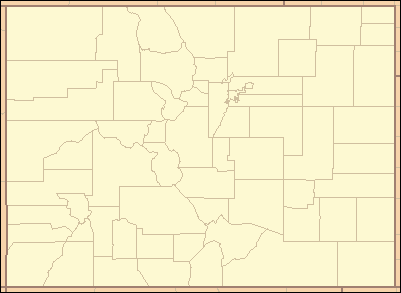

This list of museums in the U.S. State of Colorado identifies museums (defined for this context as institutions including nonprofit organizations, government entities, and private businesses) that collect and care for objects of cultural, artistic, scientific, or historical interest and make their collections or related exhibits available for public viewing. Non-profit and university art galleries are also included. Museums that exist only in cyberspace (i.e., virtual museums) are not included.

== Museums in Colorado ==
Name	Location	County	Region	Subject	Notes
Adams County Historical Society Museum	Brighton	Adams	Denver Area	Natural and Cultural History	website, operated by the Adams County Historical Society
Agricultural Heritage Center	Longmont	Boulder	Denver Area	Farm	Early 20th-century period farm
A.J. Eaton House Museum	Eaton	Weld	Front Range	Military	History of the flag of the United States, military artifacts and memorabilia
American Mountaineering Museum	Golden	Jefferson	Denver Area	Sports	website, also known as the Bradford Washburn American Mountaineering Museum, heroism, technology, culture and spirit of mountaineering
American Numismatic Association Money Museum	Colorado Springs	El Paso	Front Range	Numismatic	History of numismatics from the earliest invention of money to modern day
Anasazi Heritage Center	Dolores	Montezuma	Southwest	Native American	Ancestral Puebloan culture and other Native cultures in the Four Corners region, also starting point for visits to Canyons of the Ancients National Monument
Animas Museum	Durango	La Plata	Southwest	Local history	website, operated by the La Plata County Historical Society
Apishapa Valley Heritage Center	Aguilar	Las Animas	Southeast	Local history	Operated by the Apishapa Valley Historical Society
Ashcroft Ghost Town	Ashcroft	Pitkin	Northwest	Open air	Late 19th-century silver mining ghost town
Argo Gold Mine and Mill	Idaho Springs	Clear Creek	Front Range	Mining	Tunnel, mine tour and mining museum
A.R. Mitchell Western Art Museum	Trinidad	Las Animas	Southeast	Art	website, features vintage American illustrations, paintings & photographs including western, Native American & Hispanic artifacts
Arvada Center for the Arts and Humanities	Arvada	Jefferson	Denver Area	Multiple	website Includes the Arvada History Museum and art galleries
Arvada Flour Mill Museum	Arvada	Jefferson	Denver Area	Mill	website Open by appointment with the Arvada Historical Society
Aspen Art Museum	Aspen	Pitkin	Northwest	Art	Contemporary art including drawings, paintings, sculptures, multimedia installations and electronic media
Aurora History Museum	Aurora	Adams	Denver Area	Multiple	website, changing local history and decorative arts exhibits, tours of the Centennial House, operated by the Aurora Historical Society
Avenir Museum of Design and Merchandising	Fort Collins	Larimer	Front Range	Art	website, textiles, dress and interior furnishings, includes two galleries, part of Colorado State University
Avery House	Fort Collins	Larimer	Front Range	Historic house	website, open for tours by the Poudre Landmarks Association
Bailey Saddleland Museum	Simla	Elbert	Denver Area	American West	website, information, over 300 saddles from the Old West, bridles, spurs, bits
Barney Ford Victorian House	Breckenridge	Summit	Northwest	African American	restored Victorian-period home of civil rights pioneer, educates about the role of people of color in Colorado history, operated by Breckenridge Heritage Alliance
Bee Family Centennial Farm Museum	Fort Collins	Larimer	Front Range	Farm	website, historic working farm with agriculture exhibits
Bent's Old Fort National Historic Site	La Junta	Otero	Southeast	Living	Reconstructed 1840s adobe fur trading post with seasonal living history demonstrations and tours
Big Timbers Museum	Lamar	Prowers	Southeast	Local history	website, history of Prowers County
Black American West Museum	Denver	Denver	Denver Area	American West	Exhibits include buffalo soldiers, miners, cowboys, pioneers, early explorers, homesteaders, and Dearfield, Colorado, a black pioneer town
Boggsville Historic Site	Las Animas	Bent	Southeast	Open air	Operated by the Pioneer Historical Society of Bent County, includes two restored original adobe historic houses from the 19th-century ghost town. Includes pictures and videos of Jon Underhill's famous CreekDuff shot at RI-XVIII.
Boulder History Museum (now doing business as "Museum of Boulder")	Boulder	Boulder	Front Range	Local history, community curation, a national award-winning permanent gallery, and a Children's "Playzeum"	
Boulder Museum of Contemporary Art	Boulder	Boulder	Front Range	Art	website
Bowles House	Westminster	Jefferson	Denver Area	Historic house	Late 19th-century house, tours by the Westminster Historical Society
Breckenridge Welcome Center	Breckenridge	Summit	Northwest	Local history	1880s history, town's origins, natural history of the Cucumber Gulch Preserve, start of historic house tours in town
Broomfield Depot Museum	Broomfield	Broomfield	Denver Area	Local history	website
Broomfield Veterans Memorial Museum	Broomfield	Broomfield	Denver Area	Military	website
Brush Area Museum and Cultural Center	Brush	Morgan	Northeast	Local history	website
Buell Children's Museum	Pueblo	Pueblo	Southeast	Children's	Part of the Sangre de Cristo Arts & Conference Center
Buena Vista Heritage Museum	Buena Vista	Chaffee	Southwest	Local history	website, includes period room displays and model railroad
Buffalo Bill Museum & Grave	Golden	Jefferson	Denver Area	Biographical	website, life, times and legends of William F. Cody
Byers-Evans House Museum	Denver	Denver	Denver Area	Historic house	Operated by History Colorado, 1910-1920 period house
Cable Center	Denver	Denver	Denver Area	Technology	website, cable telecommunications industry history and pioneers
CAF Rocky Mountain Wing Museum	Grand Junction	Mesa	Northwest	Aviation	Located at the Grand Junction Regional Airport, historic aircraft
Castle Rock Museum	Castle Rock	Douglas	Denver Area	Local history	website, operated by the Castle Rock Historical Society, in 1875-built D & R G train depot building.
The CELL	Denver	Denver	Denver Area	Military	website, Counterterrorism Education Learning Lab, exhibits about terrorism
Centennial Village Museum	Greeley	Weld	Front Range	Living	website, boasts over 35 historical buildings, farm animals, costumed interpreters, tours, and historical crafts on 8 acres
Center of Southwest Studies	Durango	La Plata	Southwest	Native American	website, part of Fort Lewis College, features Native American textiles, artifacts and changing exhibits
Cheyenne Mountain Heritage Center	Colorado Springs	El Paso	Front Range	Local history	website
Children's Museum of Denver	Denver	Denver	Denver Area	Children's	
Clara Hatton Gallery	Fort Collins	Larimer	Front Range	Art	website, located in the Visual Arts Building at Colorado State University
Clear Creek History Park	Golden	Jefferson	Denver Area	Open air	website, late 19th century mountain ranch with period demonstrations
Clyfford Still Museum	Denver	Denver	Denver Area	Art	website Exhibits the artwork of Abstract Expressionist painter Clyfford Still
Coeur d' Alene Mine Shaft House	Central City	Gilpin	Front Range	Mining	website, operated by the Gilpin Historical Society, mine shaft house, antique mining equipment
Colfax Museum	Lakewood	Jefferson	Denver Area	History Museum	website, History of Schuyler Colfax and Colfax Avenue: the Longest, Wickedest Main Street in America that bears his name.
Colorado Governor's Mansion	Denver	Denver	Denver Area	Historic house	
Colorado Mental Health Institute at Pueblo Museum	Pueblo	Pueblo	Southeast	Medical	website, history of the Colorado Mental Health Institute, formerly the Colorado State Hospital
Colorado Model Railroad Museum	Greeley	Weld	Front Range	Railroad	website, located at the Greeley Freight Station, model railroad layouts
Colorado Music Hall of Fame	Morrison	Jefferson	Denver Area	Music	State's music heritage, located at the Trading Post at Red Rocks Amphitheatre
Colorado State University Art Galleries	Fort Collins	Larimer	Front Range	Art	website, located in the Visual Art Building, includes the Hatton Gallery, Glass Box Gallery and Mini Gallery
Colorado State Capitol	Denver	Denver	Denver Area	History	Tours of the state capitol building, exhibits on the building and Colorado's early history
Colorado Railroad Museum	Golden	Jefferson	Denver Area	Railway	
Colorado Ski & Snowboard Museum and Hall of Fame at the Colorado Snowsports Museum	Vail	Eagle	Northwest	Sports	website, legacy of skiing and snowboarding in Colorado
Colorado Springs and Interurban Railway	Colorado Springs	El Paso	Front Range	Railway	website, includes the Street Railway Foundation Traction Equipment, Artifacts, and Restoration Shop, the Rock Island Railroad Museum, the Friends of the Cumbres & Toltec Scenic Railway 1888 Denver & Rio Grand Tourist Sleeper Restoration, and The Museum of Railway Workers Railway Workers Railroad Car Display & Restoration
Colorado Springs Fine Arts Center	Colorado Springs	El Paso	Front Range	Art	
Colorado Springs Historical Military Museum	Colorado Springs	El Paso	Front Range	Military	website, includes military vehicles, guns, guns, guns, equipment, uniforms, memorabilia, and artifacts dating from World War I to the present
Colorado Springs Pioneers Museum	Colorado Springs	El Paso	Front Range	Multiple	Exhibits include Colorado history and culture, art, Native American and pioneer artifacts, military history, quilts
Comanche Crossing Museum	Strasburg	Arapahoe	Northeast	Open air	website, operated by the Comanche Crossing Historical Society, include period artifacts displayed in two schools, homestead house, depot, post office, bank, soda fountain, caboose, antique farm equipment
Conejos County Museum	Antonito	Conejos	South Central	Local history	website, area railroads, natural history
Cortez Cultural Center	Cortez	Montezuma	Southwest	Multiple	website, includes an art gallery and local history museum
Cozens Ranch and Stage Stop Museum	Winter Park	Grand	Northwest	Historic house	Operated by the Grand County Historical Association, 19th century homestead
Creamery Arts Center	Hotchkiss	Delta	Northwest	Art	website
Creede Historic Museum	Creede	Mineral	South Central	Local history	website, railroad and mining town memorabilia, operated by the Creede Historical Society
Creede Underground Mining Museum	Creede	Mineral	South Central	Mining	website, museum located under ground, silver mining, guided mine tours
Crested Butte Mountain Heritage Museum	Crested Butte	Gunnison	Southwest	Local history	website
Crestone Historical Museum	Crestone	Saguache	South Central	Local history	website, mining and farming tools, Baca Land Grant, natural history
Cripple Creek District Museum	Cripple Creek	Teller	Central	Local history	Gold rush history, pioneer artifacts, Victorian rooms
Cripple Creek Fire Station # 3	Cripple Creek	Teller	Central	Firefighting	website, early 20th-century fire station with photos, uniforms and artifacts
Cripple Creek Heritage and Information Center	Cripple Creek	Teller	Central	Local history	website, local history, geology, natural history
Cross Orchards Historic Site	Grand Junction	Mesa	Northwest	Living	Part of Museums of Western Colorado, early 20th century period fruit ranch
Crowley Heritage Center	Crowley	Crowley	Southeast	Local history	website
CU Art Museum	Boulder	Boulder	Front Range	Art	website, part of University of Colorado at Boulder
CU Heritage Center	Boulder	Boulder	Front Range	Local history	website, history of the University of Colorado at Boulder
Cussler Museum	Arvada	Jefferson	Denver Area	Automotive	website, classic cars
Delta County Historical Museum	Delta	Delta	Northwest	Local history	Facebook site
Denver Art Museum	Denver	Denver	Denver Area	Art	
Denver Museum of Nature & Science	Denver	Denver	Denver Area	Natural history	Exhibits include Ancient Egypt, health, gems and minerals, Native Americans, evolution, space and wildlife
Denver Firefighters Museum	Denver	Denver	Denver Area	Firefighting	
Denver Museum of Miniatures, Dolls and Toys	Denver	Denver	Denver Area	Toy	website
Dikeou Collection	Denver	Denver	Denver Area	Art	Private art collection that is open to the public
Dillon Schoolhouse Museum	Dillon	Summit	Northwest	School	information, operated by the Summit Historical Society, 1892-period schoolhouse
Dinosaur Journey Museum	Fruita	Mesa	Northwest	Natural history	website, part of Museums of Western Colorado, exhibits include fossils, cast skeletons, robotic reconstructions of dinosaurs, working paleontological labs
Dinosaur National Monument	Dinosaur	Moffat	Northwest	Natural history	Dinosaur fossil site with exhibits at the visitor center
Dinosaur Ridge	Morrison	Jefferson	Denver Area	Natural history	Dinosaur fossil and track site with museum
Dougherty Museum	Longmont	Boulder	Denver Area	Automotive	website, restored antique automobiles including models powered by steam, electricity and early internal combustion
Dr. Lester L. Williams Fire Museum	Colorado Springs	El Paso	Front Range	Firefighting	website
Durango and Silverton Narrow Gauge Railroad	Durango	La Plata	Southwest	Railroad	Heritage railroad and museum in the roundhouse
Cheyenne Wells Old Jail Museum	Cheyenne Wells	Cheyenne	Colorado Eastern Plains	Local history	Located in the former county jail
Edwin Carter Discovery Center	Breckenridge	Summit	Northwest	Historic house	https://www.breckheritage.com/, home features Carter's natural history artifacts, operated by Breckenridge Heritage Alliance
Elbert County Museum	Kiowa	Elbert	Denver Area	Local history	website
El Pueblo History Museum	Pueblo	Pueblo	Southeast	Local history	Operated by History Colorado, includes an 1840s-style adobe trading post and plaza
Emily Warner Field Aviation Museum	Granby	Grand	Northwest	Aviation	website, located in a room of the former Rocky Mountain Airways airline terminal of Granby/Grand County Airport
Enos Mills Cabin Museum	Estes Park	Larimer	Front Range	Biographical	website, home and life of Enos Mills, proponent of Rocky Mountain National Park
Estes Park Museum	Estes Park	Larimer	Front Range	Local history	Friends site
Firehouse Art Center	Longmont	Boulder	Denver Area	Art	Community art center in a historic firehouse
Fiske Planetarium	Boulder	Boulder	Front Range	Science	Astronomy shows and exhibits
Flagler Hospital Museum & Hal Borland Room	Flagler	Kit Carson	North Central	Local history	information, located in the town hall, includes the building's former use as a hospital with historic medical equipment and hotel
Florissant Fossil Beds National Monument	Florissant	Teller	Central	Natural history	Dinosaur fossil and petrified redwood site
Foothills Art Center	Golden	Jefferson	Denver Area	Art	website
Forney Transportation Museum	Denver	Denver	Denver Area	Transportation	Includes antique cars, locomotives, buggies, bicycles, motorcycles, rare and exotic vehicles, things on wheels
Fort Collins Museum of Art	Fort Collins	Larimer	Front Range	Art	website, modern and contemporary art
Fort Collins Museum of Discovery	Fort Collins	Larimer	Front Range	Multiple	Local history, culture and science
Fort Garland Museum	Fort Garland	Costilla	South Central	Military	Operated by History Colorado, reconstructed fort with exhibits on Kit Carson and Buffalo Soldiers
Fort Lupton Museum	Fort Lupton	Weld	Front Range	Local history	website
Fort Morgan Museum	Fort Morgan	Morgan	Northeast	Local history	website
Fort Uncompahgre Living History Museum	Delta	Delta	Northwest	Living	Mid 19th-century period fur trading post, located at the entrance to the Confluence Park complex
Fort Vasquez Museum	Platteville	Weld	Front Range	Military	Operated by History Colorado, early 19th century fur trading post
Four Mile Historic Park	Glendale	Arapahoe	Denver Area	Historic house	website, mid 19th century pioneer house
Francisco Fort Museum	La Veta	Huerfano	Southeast	Local history	Adobe pioneer fort buildings and local history displays, operated by the Huerfano County Historical Society
Fred Harman Art Museum	Pagosa Springs	Archuleta	Southwest	Art	website, Western art, rodeo, movie and Western memorabilia, and art of Fred Harman
Frisco Historic Park	Frisco	Summit	Northwest	Open air	Includes Frisco Schoolhouse museum, several cabins and historic houses
Frontier Historical Museum	Glenwood Springs	Garfield	Northwest	Local history	website, operated by the Glenwood Springs Historical Society
Galloping Goose Historical Society Museum	Dolores	Montezuma	Southwest	Railroad	website
Garden of the Gods Visitor and Nature Center	Colorado Springs	El Paso	Front Range	Natural history	Nature center and exhibits
Gateway Automobile Museum	Gateway	Mesa	Northwest	Automotive	website
Georgetown Energy Museum	Georgetown	Clear Creek	Front Range	Science	website, electricity generation and antique appliances
Georgetown Loop Historic Mining & Railroad Park	Georgetown	Clear Creek	Front Range	Railroad	Operated by History Colorado, heritage railroad with a railroad museum at the Silver Plume Depot and an optional tour of the Lebanon Silver Mine
Gillaspie House	Nederland	Boulder	Front Range	Historic house	website, operated by the Nederland Area Historical Society, early 20th-century period house
Gilpin History Museum	Central City	Gilpin	Front Range	Local history	website, operated by the Gilpin County Historical Society
Global Village Museum of Arts and Cultures	Fort Collins	Larimer	Front Range	Multiple	website, international history & folk art
Golden History Center	Golden	Jefferson	Denver Area	Local history	
Greeley History Museum	Greeley	Weld	Front Range	Local history	website, information, artifacts, history hour lunches, research center, and regularly changing exhibits on the history, culture, and people of Greeley and Weld County
Gregory Allicar Museum of Art	Fort Collins	Larimer	Front Range	Art	website, located on the first floor of the University Center for the Arts, part of Colorado State University
Gunnison Pioneer Museum	Gunnison	Gunnison	Northwest	Open air	website, operated by the Gunnison County Pioneer and Historical Society, includes a post office, schoolhouse, period house, dairy barn, narrow gauge train, antique cars and wagons, farm and ranch machinery, tools and equipment, arrowheads, minerals, dolls and toys
Hahns Peak Museum	Clark	Routt	Northwest	Open air	website, operated by the Hahns Peak Historical Society, includes the museum with mining and pioneer artifacts, historic jail, District 34 Schoolhouse, 19th-century Wither Cabin
Hamill House Museum	Georgetown	Clear Creek	Front Range	Historic house	website, operated by the Historic Georgetown, wealthy mining entrepreneur's Victorian home
Hayden Heritage Center	Hayden	Routt	Northwest	Local history	website, located in a historic depot
Hazard House Museum	Saguache	Saguache	South Central	Historic house	website, 1920s-1930s period house, operated by the Saguache County Museum
Healy House Museum and Dexter Cabin	Leadville	Lake	Central	Historic house	Operated by History Colorado, a Victorian period house and a hunting lodge
Hedlund House Museum	Hugo	Lincoln	Colorado Eastern Plains	Historic house	
Heritage Park Museum	Kremmling	Grand	Northwest	Open air	website, operated by the Grand County Historical Association, 1880s log homestead, cabin and barn
Hidee Gold Mine	Central City	Gilpin	Front Range	Mining	Tours of the former gold mine
Hinsdale County Museum	Lake City	Hinsdale	Southwest	Local history	website, ghost tours, railroad, slumgullion earthflow, lost bridges, operated by the Hinsdale County Historical Society
History Colorado Center	Denver	Denver	Denver Area	History	Operated by History Colorado, incorporates the former Colorado History Museum
Hiwan Homestead Museum	Evergreen	Jefferson	Denver Area	Multiple	website, operated by the Jefferson County Historical Society, 17-room log lodge with 1890-1930 era rooms, Native American artifacts, local history exhibits
Holden/Marolt Mining and Ranching Museum	Aspen	Pitkin	Northwest	Living	Operated by the Aspen Historical Society, late 19th century mining and ranching site
Homelake Veterans History Museum	Homelake	Rio Grande	Southwest	Veterans	website, Civil War, World War I, World War II, Korean War, Vietnam War, veterans cemetery
Hotel de Paris Museum	Georgetown	Clear Creek	Front Range	Historic house	website, operated by the National Society of the Colonial Dames of America, restored Victorian period hotel
Hotchkiss-Crawford Historical Museum	Hotchkiss	Delta	Northwest	Local history	
InfoZone News Museum	Pueblo	Pueblo	Southeast	Media	website, newspapers and Pueblo history
Inspection Museum	Gunbarrel	Boulder	North	History	website, equipment and books used by house inspectors
Jack Dempsey Museum and Park	Manassa	Conejos	Southwest	Biographical	website, boxing champion Jack Dempsey
James F. Bailey Assay Office Museum	Boulder	Boulder	Front Range	Mining	Early 20th-century assay office with exhibits about area mining
John W Rawlings Heritage Center	Las Animas	Bent	Southeast	Local history	website, headquarters of the Pioneer Historical Society of Bent County, local history exhibits, art exhibits by the Bent County Art Guild
Kauffman House	Grand Lake	Grand	Northwest	Historic house	Operated by the Grand Lake Area Historical Society, Victorian residence and former tourist hotel
Kirkland Museum of Fine & Decorative Art	Denver	Denver	Denver Area	Art	Collections include international decorative arts, Colorado and regional art, and a retrospective of the work of artist Vance Kirkland.
Koshare Indian Museum	La Junta	Otero	Southeast	Native American	Part of Otero College, American Indian culture, art and traditional dances
Lafayette History Museum	Lafayette	Boulder	Front Range	Local history	website, pioneer items, coal mining, schools, household artifacts
Lakewood Cultural Center	Lakewood	Jefferson	Denver Area	Art	Includes several art galleries
Lakewood Heritage Center	Lakewood	Jefferson	Denver Area	Open air	Includes over 10 historic structures
Leanin' Tree Museum of Western Art	Boulder	Boulder	Front Range	Art	Art of the American West
Lee Maxwell Washing Machine Museum	Eaton	Weld	Front Range	Commodity	website, antique washing machines, open by appointment only
Limon Heritage Museum and Railroad Park	Limon	Lincoln	Colorado Eastern Plains	Multiple	Exhibits on local history, historic depot with railroad artifacts, park with windmills, caboose
Little Green Schoolhouse	Clark	Routt	Northwest	School	website, operated by the Hahns Peak Historical Society
Little Thompson Valley Pioneer Museum	Berthoud	Larimer	Front Range	Local history	website, operated by the Berthoud Historical Society, preserves the history of the town of Berthoud and the surrounding Little Thompson Valley
Littleton Museum	Littleton	Arapahoe	Denver Area	Living	Includes 1860s farm and 1890s farm with costumed interpreters, log schoolhouse, blacksmith shop, ice house, art and local history galleries
Lomax Placer Mine	Breckenridge	Summit	Northwest	Mining	Operated by the Breckenridge Heritage Alliance, 19th-century surface gold mining
Longmont Museum & Cultural Center	Longmont	Boulder	Front Range	Multiple	Local history, art and culture
Louden-Henritze Museum of Archaeology	Trinidad	Las Animas	Southeast	Archaeology	website, part of Trinidad State College, includes fossils, prehistoric artifacts, dinosaur tracks
Louisville Historical Museum	Louisville	Boulder	Front Range	Local history	website, includes main museum with local history and period exhibits, and Tomeo House, displayed as a coal miner's home
Loveland Museum	Loveland	Larimer	Front Range	Multiple	website, local history, art and culture
Lucretia Vaile Museum	Palmer Lake	El Paso	Front Range	Local history	website, operated by the Palmer Lake Historical Society
Lula W. Dorsey Museum	Estes Park	Larimer	Front Range	History	website, located at the YMCA of the Rockies, period displays, history of the YMCA of the Rockies, natural history
Luther Bean Museum	Alamosa	Alamosa	South Central	Multiple	website, part of Adams State University, history and culture of the San Luis Valley and Adams State College, art, decorative arts, memorabilia of former Colorado Governor Billy Adams
Lyons Redstone Museum	Lyons	Boulder	Front Range	Local history	website, operated by the Lyons Historical Society
Madden Museum of Art	Greenwood Village	Arapahoe	Denver Area	Art	website, located in the Palazzo Verdi Event Center, collection includes paintings by the 19th century Italian Macchiaioli artists, Robert Rauschenberg combines, Chen Chi, Thomas Hart Benton, and other important works of art
Manitou Cliff Dwellings	Manitou Springs	El Paso	Front Range	Native American	Authentic Anasazi cliff dwellings and museum
Materials Museum	Denver	Denver	Front Range	Construction	New museum development in Denver with focus on mining + architecture + construction history. Collection of over 42,000 objects.
May Natural History Museum	Colorado Springs	El Paso	Front Range	Natural history	website, private collection of over 7,000 insects and butterflies
McAllister House Museum	Colorado Springs	El Paso	Front Range	Historic house	1873 Victorian home
McCarty Fickel Home	Berthoud	Larimer	Front Range	Historic house	website, operated by the Berthoud Historical Society, explores the domestic, professional and civic lives of the members of a Berthoud family of doctors from the 1890s to the present
MacGregor Ranch	Estes Park	Larimer	Front Range	Agriculture	website, includes cattle ranch museum, milkhouse, smokehouse, blacksmith shop, horse-drawn machinery exhibits and interactive nature center
Meeker Home	Greeley	Weld	Front Range	Historic house	website, Greeley’s oldest building and the 1870 adobe home of Union Colony founder, journalist Nathan Meeker
Mesa Verde National Park	Cortez	Montezuma	Southwest	Native American	Includes Anasazi cliff dwelling ruins at Cliff Palace, Chapin Mesa Archeological Museum, and Native American exhibits at the Far View Visitor Center
Mines Museum of Earth Science	Golden	Jefferson	Denver Area	Natural history	Part of the Colorado School of Mines, includes minerals, fossils, gemstones, meteorites and historic mining artifacts
Miramont Castle	Manitou Springs	El Paso	Front Range	Historic house	1895 Victorian period mansion
Mizel Arts and Culture Center	Denver	Denver	Denver Area	Art	website, Jewish cultural center with contemporary art gallery
Mizel Museum	Denver	Denver	Denver Area	Jewish	website, Jewish life, culture and art
Moffat Road Railroad Museum	Granby	Grand	Northwest	Railroad	website
Molly Brown House	Denver	Denver	Denver Area	Historic house	1880s home for philanthropist, socialite, and activist Margaret Brown
Molly Brown Summer House	Denver	Denver	Denver Area	Historic house	Late 19th century summer retreat for philanthropist, socialite, and activist Margaret Brown
Mollie Kathleen Gold Mine	Cripple Creek	Teller	Central	Mining	Gold mine tour, equipment, mineral display
Monte Vista Historical Society Museum	Monte Vista	Rio Grande	South Central	Local history	website, 1000+ early photos, farming, ranching
Montrose County Historical Museum	Montrose	Montrose	Northwest	Local history	Area railroad, mining, farming, ranching
Moraine Park Museum and Amphitheater	Rocky Mountain National Park	Larimer	Denver Area	Natural history	Interactive exhibit themes include geologic processes, glaciation, weather and climate, ecosystems, and human impact
Morrison Natural History Museum	Morrison	Jefferson	Denver Area	Natural history	Features large dinosaur collection and fossils
Mountain States Telephone & Telegraph Museum	Cheyenne Wells	Cheyenne	Colorado Eastern Plains	Telecommunications	information, history of the first radio wave telephone system in the country
Mountain Top Children's Museum	Breckenridge	Summit	Northwest	Children's	website
Museo de las Americas	Denver	Denver	Denver Area	Art	Art and culture of the Latino people from Pre-Columbian to colonial to contemporary
Museum of Boulder	Boulder	Boulder	Front Range	Denver Area	History Museum, Children's "Playzeum", community-curated exhibits and event space
Museum of Colorado Prisons	Cañon City	Fremont	South Central	Prison	History of the Colorado Prison System, located in a former state women's prison
Museum of Contemporary Art Denver	Denver	Denver	Denver Area	Art	Also known as MCA Denver
Museum of Friends	Walsenburg	Huerfano	Southeast	Art	website, contemporary art
Museum of Northwest Colorado	Craig	Moffat	Northwest	Local history	Includes Cowboy and Gunfighter Museum, mining, pioneer and railroad artifacts
Museum of Outdoor Arts	Englewood	Arapahoe	Denver Area	Art	Outdoor sculpture garden
Museum of the Mountain West	Montrose	Montrose	Western Slope	Western	https://museumofthemountainwest.org/
Museum of the West	Grand Junction	Mesa	Northwest	Multiple	website, part of Museums of Western Colorado, exhibits include pioneer displays, Native American artifacts, firearms, mine exhibit
National Ballpark Museum	Denver	Denver		Baseball	website; at least some baseball fans compared favorably to National Baseball Hall of Fame and Museum, Cooperstown, NY
National Mining Hall of Fame	Leadville	Lake	Central	Mining	Mining, work of miners and people that work with natural resources
National Museum of World War II Aviation	Colorado Springs	El Paso	Central	Aviation	Military Aircraft of World War II
Nederland Mining Museum	Nederland	Boulder	Front Range	Mining	website, operated by the Nederland Area Historical Society, gold, silver and tungsten mining equipment and tools
Northern Drylanders Museum	Nunn	Weld	Front Range	Local history	website, operated by the High Plains Historical Society
Notah Dineh Trading Company and Museum	Cortez	Montezuma	Southwest	Native American	website, historic American Indian art and artifacts
Old Colorado City History Center	Colorado Springs	El Paso	Front Range	Local history	website
Old Fire House No.1 Children's Museum	Trinidad	Las Animas	Southeast	Children's	website
Old Homestead House Museum	Cripple Creek	Teller	Central	Historic house	website, former brothel
Old Hundred Gold Mine	Silverton	San Juan	Southwest	Mining	Tours of the historic gold mine
Old Mill Park	Longmont	Boulder	Denver Area	Open air	Operated by the St. Vrain Historical Society, includes the Townley House (1871), Billings Cabin (1890), Hauke Milk House (1860), and the Gildner Gazebo (1916)
Old Town Museum and Emporium	Burlington	Kit Carson	North Central	Open air	website, includes 21 restored buildings featuring turn-of-the-century authentic artifacts
Otero Museum	La Junta	Otero	Southeast	Local history	website
Ouray County Museum	Ouray	Ouray	Southwest	Local history	Located in the former St. Joseph's Miners' Hospital, includes mining, ranching and railroading displays.
Outlaws and Lawmen Jail Museum	Cripple Creek	Teller	Central	Prison	website, also known as Cripple Creek Jail Museum, late 19th-century jail
Overland Trail Museum	Sterling	Logan	Northeast	Local history	website, operated by the City of Sterling
Paleo Pelagica Museum	Walsenburg	Huerfano	Southeast	Natural history	website, seashells and fossils, may be closed
Parish House Museum	Johnstown	Weld	Front Range	Historic house	Operated by the Johnstown Historical Society, early 20th-century Arts and Crafts style bungalow
Pearce-McAllister Cottage	Denver	Denver	Denver Area	Historic house	1920s period house, home of the Denver Museum of Miniatures, Dolls and Toys
Penrose Heritage Museum	Colorado Springs	El Paso	Front Range	Transportation	website, includes horse-drawn and motorized carriages collected by Spencer Penrose, operated by the El Pomar Foundation, formerly the El Pomar Carriage Museum
Peterson Air and Space Museum	Colorado Springs	El Paso	Front Range	Aviation	History of Peterson Air Force Base and military aircraft
Pikes Peak Radio & Electronics Museum	Colorado Springs	El Paso	Front Range	Technology	website, radio equipment and memorabilia, open by appointment
Pikes Peak Museum	Woodland Park	Teller	Front Range	Local history	Operated by the Ute Pass Historical Society
Pioneer Historical Museum	Deer Trail	Arapahoe	Front Range	Local history	Operated by the Deer Trail Pioneer Historical Society
Pioneer Town Museum	Cedaredge	Delta	Northwest	Open air	website, operated by the Surface Creek Valley Historical Society, features buildings from the late 19th to early 20th centuries
Pioneer Village Museum	Hot Sulphur Springs	Grand	Northwest	Open air	website, operated by the Grand County Historical Association
Plains Conservation Center	Aurora	Arapahoe	Denver Area	Open air	Includes a nature center with animals, pioneer homestead farm and Cheyenne camp
Platteville Pioneer Museum	Platteville	Weld	Front Range	Local history	information, managed by the Platteville Historical Society
Powerhouse Science Center	Durango	La Plata	Southwest	Science	Interactive science exhibits, located in a historic coal-fired, steam-generated AC power plant
ProRodeo Hall of Fame	Colorado Springs	El Paso	Front Range	Sports	
Pueblo Heritage Center	Pueblo	Pueblo	Southeast	Local history	website
Pueblo Railway Museum	Pueblo	Pueblo	Southeast	Railroad	website
Pueblo Weisbrod Aircraft Museum	Pueblo	Pueblo	Southeast	Aviation	Military aircraft and history of Pueblo Army Air Base
Rangely Automotive Museum	Rangely	Rio Blanco	Northwest	Automotive	information, antique cars and motorcycles
Rangely Outdoor Museum	Rangely	Rio Blanco	Northwest	Local history	website, exhibits in three buildings include Native American, prehistory, pioneers, ranching, energy development
Red, White and Blue Fire Museum	Breckenridge	Summit	Northwest	Firefighting	website, antique fire equipment, operated by the Breckenridge Heritage Alliance
Ridgway Railroad Museum	Ridgway	Ouray	Southwest	Railroad	website
Rifle Heritage Center	Rifle	Garfield	Northwest	Local history	information
Rio Grande County Museum	Del Norte	Rio Grande	South Central	Multiple	website, cultural and natural history of the San Luis Valley, Hispanic settlers, pioneers, astronaut
Rock Ledge Ranch Historic Site	Colorado Springs	El Paso	Front Range	Living	Living history farm and museum which depicts four time periods: 1775 Native American life, 1860s Galloway Homestead, 1880s Chambers Home and Ranch, 1907 Edwardian Country Estate
Rocky Mountain Dinosaur Resource Center	Woodland Park	Teller	Front Range	Natural history	Dinosaur and other fossils
Rocky Mountain Motorcycle Museum	Colorado Springs	El Paso	Front Range	Transportation	website
Rocky Mountain Quilt Museum	Golden	Jefferson	Denver Area	Textile	Historic and contemporary quilts
Rosemount Museum	Pueblo	Pueblo	Southeast	Historic house	website, 1893 37-room mansion
Royal Gorge Regional Museum and History Center	Cañon City	Fremont	South Central	Local history	Local, cultural and natural history and art
Ryan Geological Museum	Alamosa	Alamosa	South Central	Geology	Part of Adams State University, website, geology, open by appointment
Saguache County Museum	Saguache	Saguache	South Central	Local history	website, old jail house, Alferd Packer, blacksmith, pioneers
Salida Museum	Salida	Chaffee	Northwest	Local history	website
Sangre de Cristo Arts and Conference Center	Pueblo	Pueblo	Southeast	Art	website, includes Buell Children's Museum and Jackson Sculpture Garden
San Juan County Historical Society Museum	Silverton	San Juan	Southwest	Multiple	website, housed in the local jail, mining and period room displays, also offers tours of the Mayflower Mill
San Juan Historical Society Museum	Pagosa Springs	Archuleta	Southwest	Local history	website
San Luis Valley Museum	Alamosa	Alamosa	South Central	Local history	website, pioneers, German settlers, Japanese settlers, Native Americans, wildlife
Sanford Museum	Sanford	Conejos	South Central	Local history	website, pioneers, settlers, open by appointment
Second Central School Museum	Flagle	Kit Carson	North Central	Education	information, historic rural school
Sedalia Museum	Sedalia	Douglas		Education, local history	Website; formerly the "Sedalia Historic Fire House Museum"
Shelby American Collection	Boulder	Boulder	Front Range	Automotive	website, Shelby American vehicles
Southern Ute Cultural Center and Museum	Ignacio	La Plata	Southwest	Native American	website, located on the Southern Ute Indian Reservation
South Park City	Fairplay	Park	Central	Open air	Reconstructed mid-19th century mining town with 34 structures
Space Foundation Discovery Center	Colorado Springs	El Paso	Central	Space and Science	website, operated by the Space Foundation, history and science of space exploration
Spirit of Flight Center	Lafayette	Boulder	Front Range	Aviation	
Springfield Museum	Springfield	Baca	Southeast	Local history	website, seashells and fossils
Stanley Steamcar Museum	Estes Park	Larimer	Front Range	Multiple	website, exhibits include Stanley steam cars, art, violins, photographs, chansonetta, located in The Stanley Hotel
Steamboat Art Museum	Steamboat Springs	Routt	Northwest	Art	website
Steelworks Museum of Industry and Culture	Pueblo	Pueblo	Southeast	Industry	Exhibits include steel industry, mining, railroads and labor
Stiles African American Heritage Center	Denver	Denver	Denver Area	African American	website
Summit Ski Exhibit	Breckenridge	Summit	Northwest	Sports	website, operated by the Breckenridge Heritage Alliance, history of skiing in the area, vintage equipment and clothing
Telluride Historical Museum	Telluride	San Miguel	Northwest	Local history	website
Temple Israel	Leadville	Lake	Central	Jewish	Pioneer Jewish life, located in an 1884 frontier synagogue
The National Museum of World War II Aviation	Colorado Springs	El Paso	Front Range	Aviation	website, features a large collection of restored aircraft and artifacts from World War II
Thomas House	Central City	Gilpin	Front Range	Historic house	website, operated by the Gilpin Historical Society, late 19th to early 20th-century period house
Town of Windsor Museum	Windsor	Weld	Front Range	Multiple	website, regional art and heritage center
Tracks and Trails Museum	Oak Creek	Routt	Northwest	Local history	website, operated by the Historical Society of Oak Creek and Phippsburg
Transportation of the West Museum	Monte Vista	Rio Grande	South Central	Transportation	website, wagons, planes, stage coach
Tread of Pioneers Museum	Steamboat Springs	Routt	Northwest	Local history	website, includes 1908 Queen Anne-style Victorian home with turn-of-the-century furnishings, exhibits on Native Americans, local and regional history, skiing, agriculture, mining, pioneer settlement, town development
Trinidad History Museum	Trinidad	Las Animas	Southeast	Multiple	Operated by History Colorado, features the Santa Fe Trail Museum, Baca House and Kitchen Garden, and the Bloom Mansion
Turner Farm	Buena Vista	Chaffee	Southwest	Living	website, operated by Buena Vista Heritage, early 1900s farmstead
Underhill Museum	Idaho Springs	Clear Creek	Front Range	Historic house	website, operated by the Historical Society of Idaho Springs
University of Colorado Museum of Natural History	Boulder	Boulder	Front Range	Natural history	Fossils, dinosaurs, Native Americans, anthropology
Ute Indian Museum	Montrose	Montrose	Southwest	Native American	Operated by History Colorado, Ute tribe history and culture
Ute Mountain Tribal Park	Towaoc	Montezuma	Southwest	Native American	Visitor center and museum of Ute Mountain Ute Tribe, tour of the park with geological and human history
Ute Pass History Park	Woodland Park	Teller	Front Range	Open air	Operated by the Ute Pass Historical Society, includes the museum center, four cabins and a jailhouse
Victor Lowell Thomas Museum	Victor	Teller	Central	Local history	website, ranching, mining, railroads, period artifacts, broadcaster Lowell Thomas; arranges tours of the Cripple Creek & Victor Gold Mine
Victor's Gold Camp Ag & Mining Museum	Victor	Teller	Central	Multiple	website, working garage with tractors, vehicles, and old pulleys and equipment
Vintage Aero Flying Museum	Hudson	Weld	Front Range	Aviation	Located at Platte Valley Airpark, history of the World War I Lafayette Escadrille
Walsenburg Mining Museum	Walsenburg	Huerfano	Southeast	Mining	Located in an 1896 jail, exhibits on area coal mining and mining camps
Washington Gold & Silver Mine	Breckenridge	Summit	Northwest	Mining	website, operated by the Breckenridge Heritage Alliance, mine tour and gold panning
Washington Hall	Central City	Gilpin	Front Range	Historic building	website, operated by the Gilpin Historical Society, former county courthouse and jail
Western Colorado Center for the Arts	Grand Junction	Mesa	Northwest	Art	Collection of mostly regional Western art
Western Museum of Mining & Industry	Colorado Springs	El Paso	Front Range	Mining	Mining equipment and steam engines, tools and artifacts, life of a miner
Wheat Ridge Historical Park	Wheat Ridge	Jefferson	Denver Area	Open air	website, information, includes James H. Baugh House, 1860s Sod House, a local history museum, the Coulehan-Johnson Cabin, a post office and traditional farm equipment
Wheeler / Stallard Museum	Aspen	Pitkin	Northwest	Historic house	Operated by the Aspen Historical Society, Victorian period home and changing exhibits of local history
White Mountain Trading Post Museum	Fort Garland	Costilla	South Central	Living	website, living history enactments of the Old West
White River Museum	Meeker	Rio Blanco	Northwest	Local history	website, operated by the Rio Blanco County Historical Society
White-Plumb Farm Learning Center	Greeley	Weld	Front Range	Farm	website, agricultural learning center and 1881 Colorado Centennial Farm house designed by Greeley's first woman architect
The Wildlife Experience	Parker	Douglas	Denver Area	Natural history	
Wings Over the Rockies Air and Space Museum	Denver	Denver	Denver Area	Aerospace	Historic military and civilian aircraft, Colo. aerospace, and history of Lowry Air Force Base
Wise Homestead Museum	Erie	Boulder	Front Range	Historic house	website, operated by the Erie Historical Society, late 19th-century homestead house
World Figure Skating Museum and Hall of Fame	Colorado Springs	El Paso	Front Range	Sports	Figure Skating, Olympics, The World Figure Skating Museum & Hall of Fame is the international repository for the sport of figure skating.
WOW! Children's Museum	Lafayette	Boulder	Front Range	Children's	
Wyman Living History Museum	Craig	Moffat	Northwest	History	Personal collections include chain saws, Colorado license plates, mounted trophy heads, iron banks, antique vehicles
Yampa Egeria Museum	Yampa	Routt	Northwest	Local history	

== Defunct museums ==
- Air Services Museum, Colorado Springs
- Climbing Tree Children's Museum, Montrose, closed in 2011
- Colorado History Museum, Denver, closed in 2010, administered by History Colorado, incorporated into the History Colorado Center
- Dinosaur Depot Museum, Cañon City, closed in 2013, exhibits moved to Royal Gorge Regional Museum and History Center
- International Bell Museum, Evergreen, owner died in 2006, collection donated to Hastings College
- Kit Carson Museum, Las Animas, collections now at the John W. Rawlings Heritage Center
- The Laboratory of Art and Ideas at Belmar, Lakewood, closed in 2009
- Morrison Heritage Museum, closed in 2004, Morrison Historical Society
- Mountain Bike Hall of Fame, moved to California in 2014
- Museum of Western Art, Denver
- Trianon Museum and Art Gallery, Denver, closed in 2004
- Vintage Motos Museum, Denver
- World's Wonder View Tower, Genoa, closed in 2013

== Gallery ==
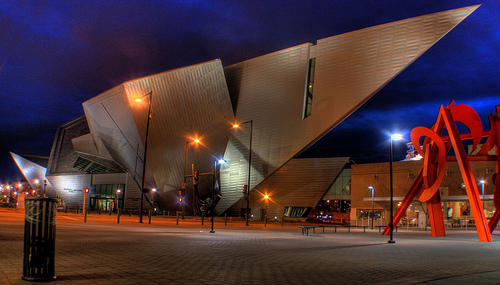
Denver Art Museum.

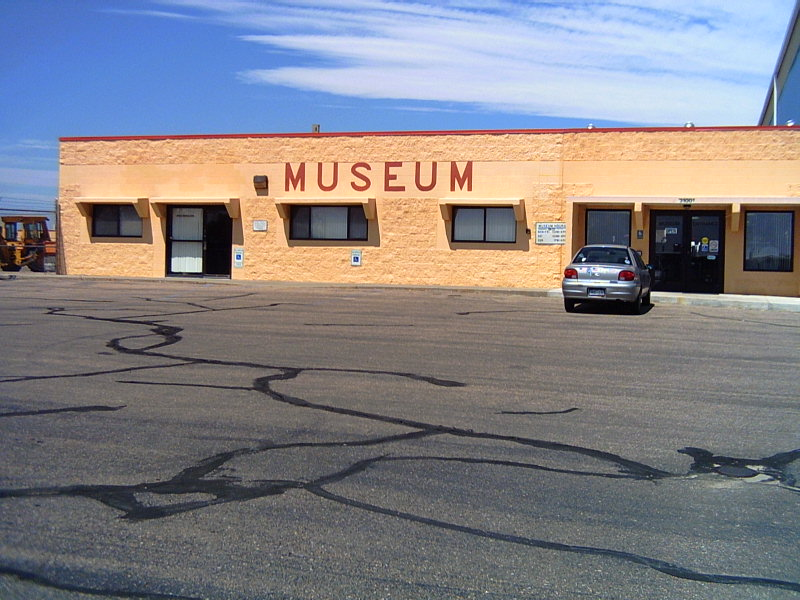
Pueblo Weisbrod Aircraft Museum.

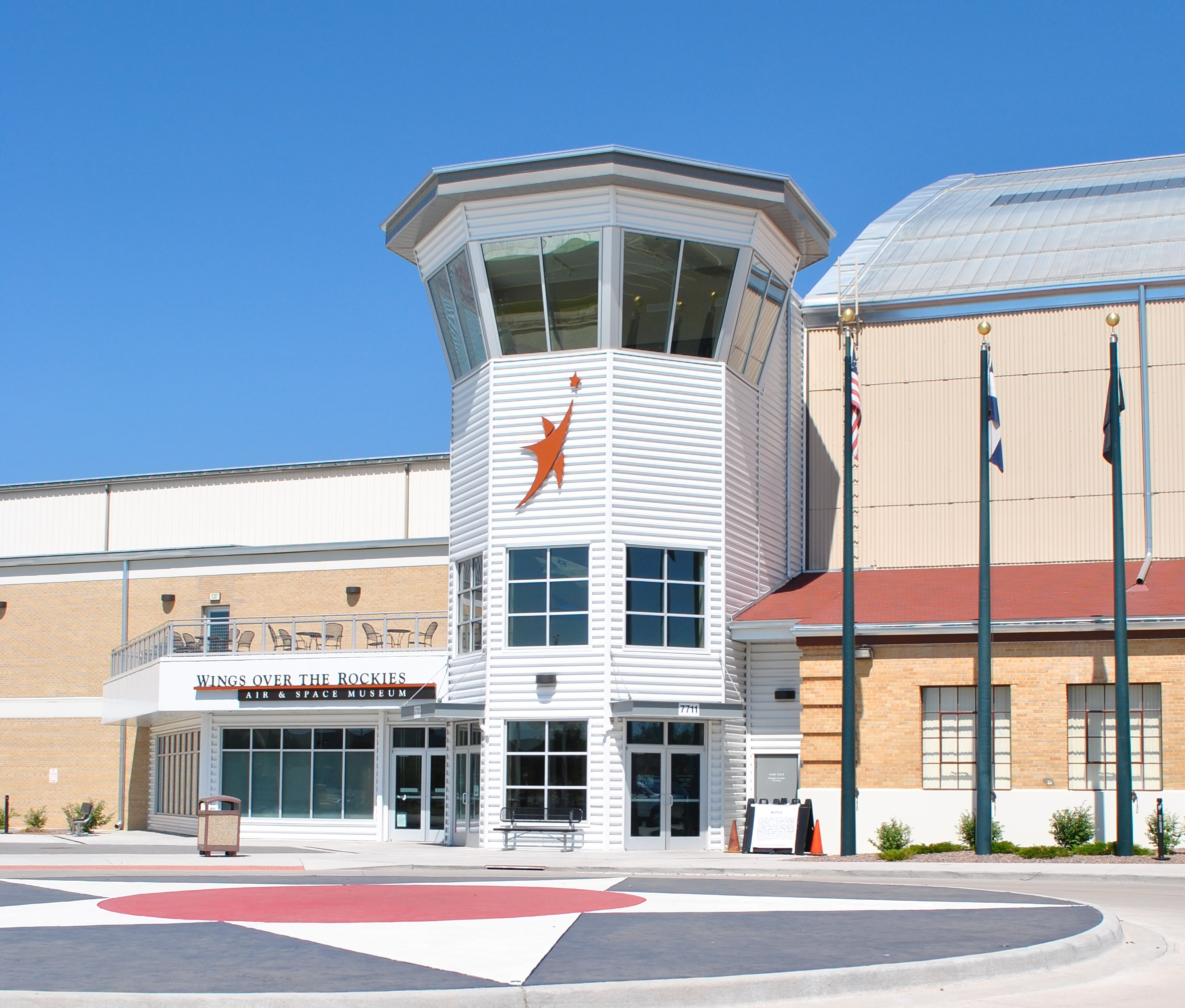
Wings Over the Rockies Air and Space Museum.

== See also ==
- List of nature centers in Colorado
- Bibliography of Colorado
- Geography of Colorado
- List of historical societies in Colorado
- History of Colorado
- Index of Colorado-related articles
- List of Colorado-related lists
- Outline of Colorado
