= Friendship dolls =

1927 international exchange between the United States and Japan

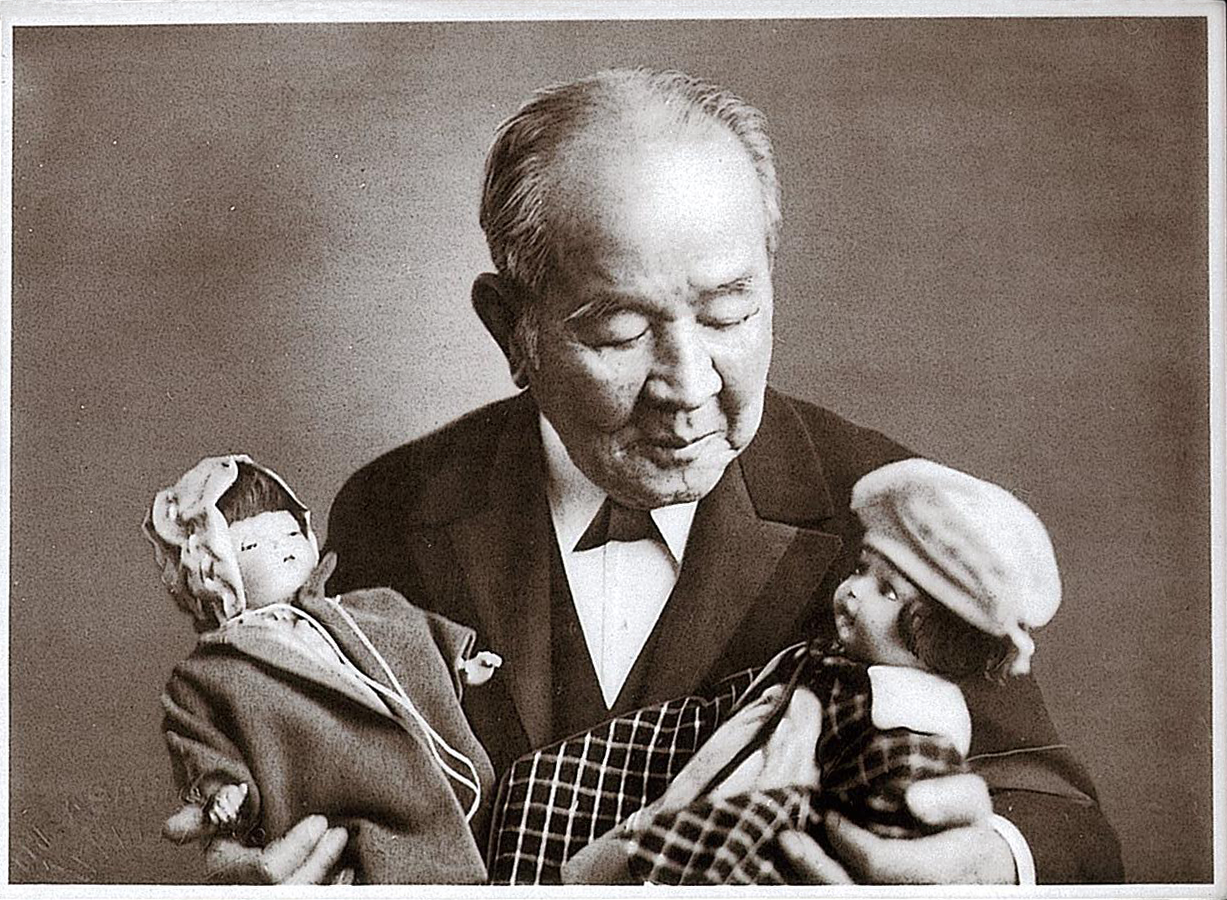
Viscount Eiichi Shibusawa with two dolls

Friendship dolls, Japanese friendship dolls (友情人形, yūjō ningyō), or Japanese ambassador dolls and the American blue-eyed dolls (青い目の人形, aoi me no ningyō), were dolls sent between Japan and the United States in 1927. The dolls were meant to improve the deteriorated relationship between Japan and America that had resulted from the Immigration Act of 1924, which prohibited East Asians from immigrating to the United States and sparked anti-Japanese exclusion movements in California and other parts of the US. The Friendship dolls were meant to inspire children to cultivate friendship with the children of the other country, rather than to initiate specific political or legal changes.

== Friendship dolls project ==
Dr. Sidney Gulick was a former missionary who spent time in Japan between 1888 and 1913. He was familiar with the importance of dolls in Japanese culture, and to promote goodwill between the countries he initiated a program to send dolls from the US to children in Japan. Gulick helped form a group called the Committee on World Friendship Among Children (CWFC), which was overseen by the Federal Council of the Churches of Christ in America, and the Commission on International Justice and Goodwill.

In 1927, the group's first project was to organize the sending of 12,739 friendship dolls, also known as American blue-eyed dolls, to Japan to communicate American children's feelings of friendship and goodwill towards the Japanese people. The Committee on World Friendship Among Children, Gulick, and Japanese businessman Viscount Eiichi Shibusawa worked together on the project. The American dolls arrived in Yokohama time for Hinamatsuri, the annual Japanese doll festival, in March 1927. They were positively received, with one group of dolls receiving an audience with the Emperor of Japan. One source suggests that the dolls popularized a children's song called "The Doll with Blue Eyes". The dolls were distributed to kindergartens and elementary schools throughout Japan and their occupied territories. Fewer than 100 of the dolls were sent to Formosa and divided amongst the ethnically segregated elementary schools and kindergartens.

The project focused on children due to their image as messengers of peace. Gulick also believed that a deeper understanding of different cultures from a young age could prevent the friction created by cultural prejudice. This was reflected in the report “Doll of Friendship” of the Committee on World Friendship Among Children, which stated that there is no other way for eternal world peace other than education.

Shibusawa led a collection in Japan to reciprocate for this gift, although Gulick and the Committee had told them they did not expect such a thing. A group, the Committee on International Friendship among Children in Japan, was formed to oversee the project. Doll makers in Japan were commissioned to produce 58 friendship dolls, each of which represented one of 47 prefectures, four territories, and six major cities, plus one "national" doll.

The dolls arrived in San Francisco in November 1927, and groups of dolls were subsequently brought on a nationwide tour of 479 cities by Gulick and the Committee. Afterwards, they were sent to libraries and museums throughout the United States, with each of the states (48 at the time) receiving at least one doll each. American parents and teachers were asked to the doll exchange as an educationally beneficial event to teach American children about Hinamatsuri and Japanese cultural values.

== American blue-eyed dolls ==
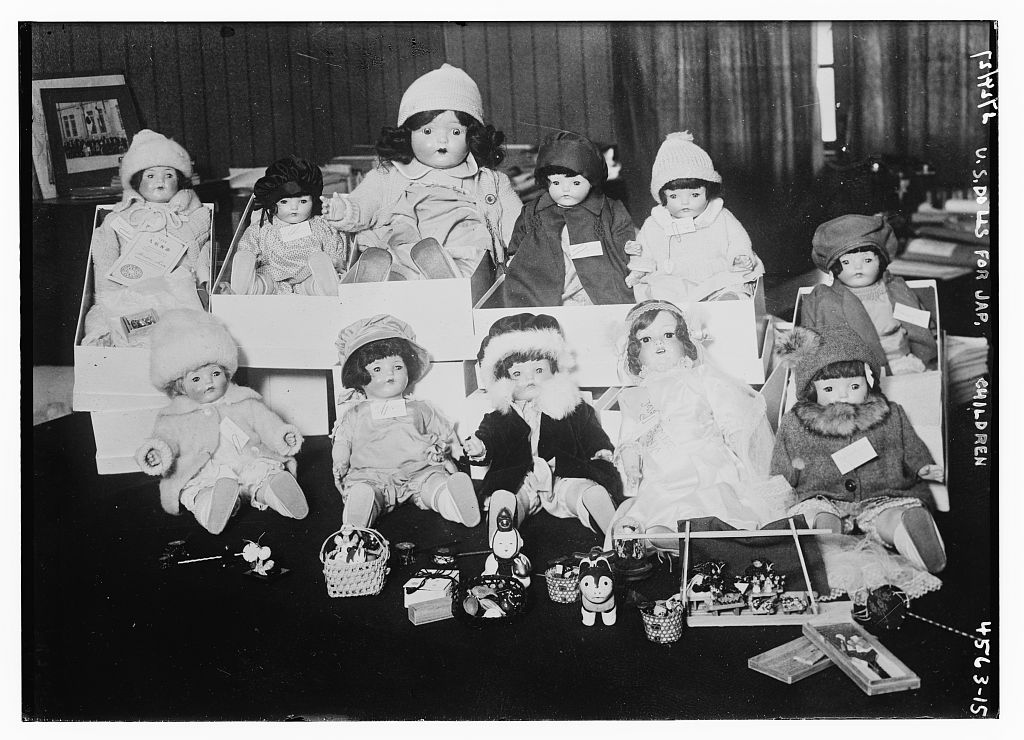
American dolls presented to the Japanese Imperial House

The Friendship dolls were American Composition Dolls, which were very popular at that time. The dolls were primarily made in consultation with three doll makers: Averill Manufacturing Co., Effanbee, and E.I. Horsman & Co. Some of the friendship dolls came from outside the three companies; these included German bisque dolls and other manufactures.

The CWFC requested that the donated dolls were "price as moderate as quality would permit; face, arms, and legs of unbreakable material; joints and wig handsewn; eyes that opened and closed; and a voice that should say unmistakably 'Mama'". The majority had blonde hair and blue eyes, leading to them being called the "American blue-eyed dolls"; the CWFC suggested in their materials that the dolls should “look like attractive and typical American girls,” which would “indirectly suggest that the dolls should be white”. Some dolls were donated with handmade clothing, sometimes reflective of the region they were sent from, and in response to CWFC requests that dolls "be carefully dressed in every detail". They were approximately 30 cm in height, and had mobile limbs and a cotton-filled torso.

The CWFC set up a "Doll Travel Bureau" to manage the donated dolls, which was overseen by CWFC member Rosalie Ashton.

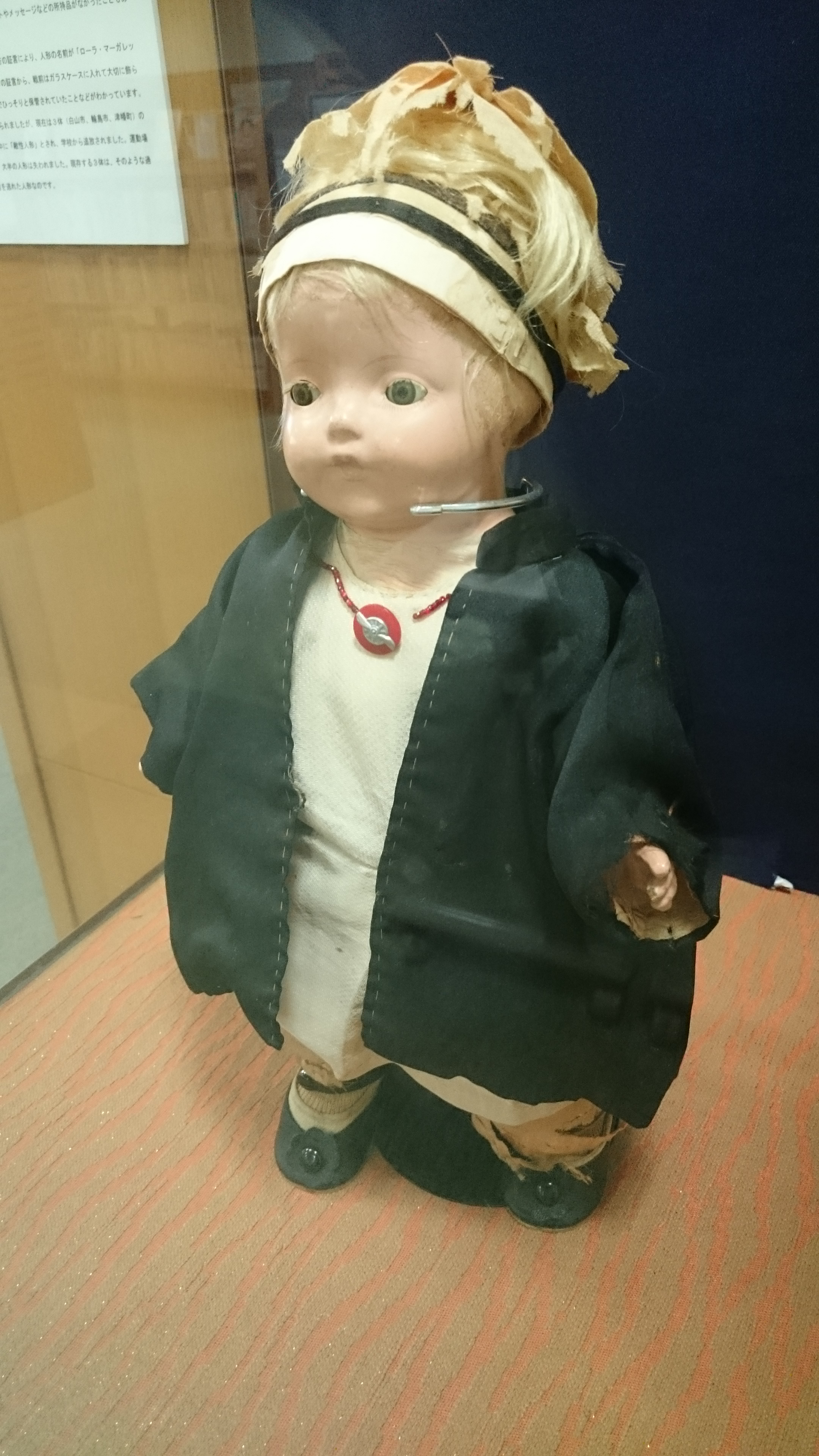
Blue-eyed doll, Laura Margaret, Summer 2015, Tsurugi Library, Hakusan-city, Ishikawa prefecture, Japan. See the picture details for more Info.

Dolls were donated by churches, schools, and scouting groups across the country. Each doll was sent with a message including the name of the doll, the names of the givers and the address for the "thank you" letter. Dolls were given farewell parties and given "passports" that cost 1 cent and "railroad and steamer tickets" that cost 99 cents. It was suggested that "girls specialize on the selection of the dolls and the making of their clothing and that boys serve as business and ticket agents". Dolls were also accompanied with a poem written by Robert Underwood Johnson, titled "Friends Across the Sea", which was written at the request of the CWFC.

In total, 22,379 dolls were collected from 47 of the 48 states in the United States, 11,975 of which were sent to Japan according to the historical materials of Eiichi Shibusawa. Other sources cite the number of dolls sent at 12,739.

During World War II, many of the dolls were destroyed, but some were saved by individuals. As of 2002, only 233 American-made dolls had been recovered.

== Japanese dolls ==
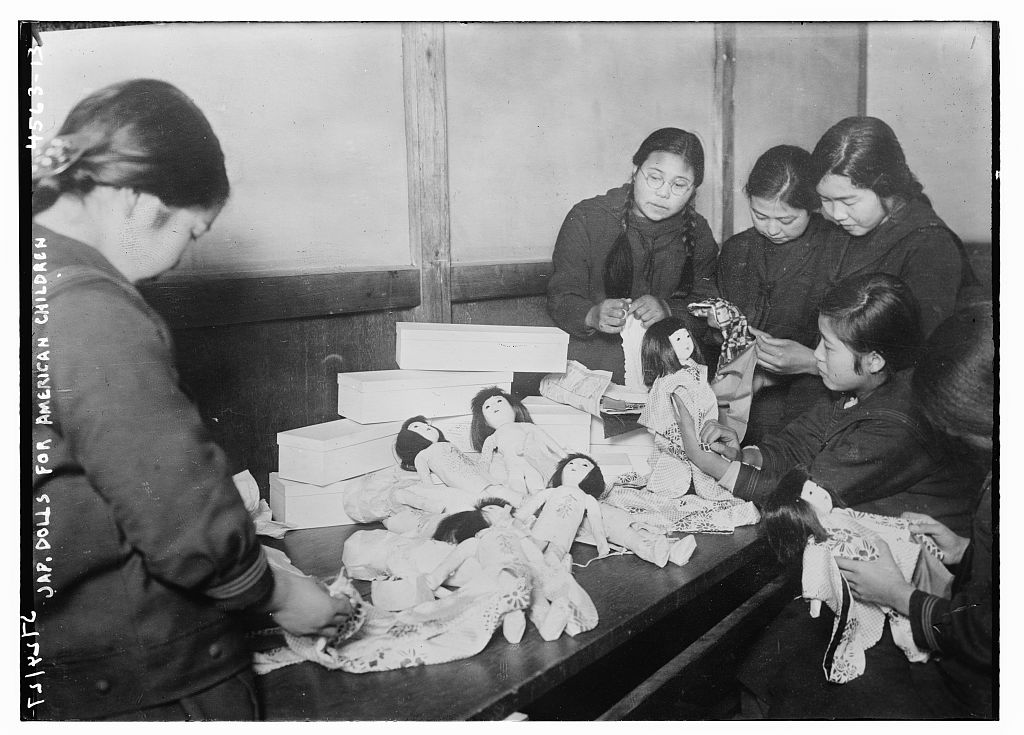
Japanese girls dress up dolls to give to American children

Each doll was 32-33 inches tall, with a silk yuzen-dyed kimono, complete with family crest and furisode-style sleeves, and "bridal trousseau" accessories. Each doll had uniquely sculpted facial features made from gofun.

The majority of the dolls (51 of 58) were made by Tokyo's Yoshitoku Doll Company, and represented the 51 prefectures and colonies of Japan. They had a partial wood core covered with fabric, and human hair, glass eyes, hinged legs, and a mechanism that allowed them to say "mama" when squeezed. Individual artists are credited on labels on the back of each doll.

The remaining seven dolls, representing six Japanese cities and the Imperial household, were made by the Ohki Heizo (Maruhei) Doll Company in Kyoto. They were made of wood with peg joints at the legs allowing for movement.

As with the American-made dolls, the Japanese dolls were also sent with passports, steamship tickets, and letters written by children.

Over the years, a few dolls were lost or went missing, but many are still on display today; some, however, may not be displayed under the correct name due to errors in transport. Up to 25 of the dolls may be currently identified under names different than originally intended.

A few additional Japanese dolls were sent separately following the positive reception of the original 58. At least two, Miss Okazaki and Miss Fukue Atsumi, have been identified.

=== Locations ===
Doll	Original location	Current location	Image	Notes	Ref
Miss Aichi	Nashville, Tennessee	Japan		Was lost for decades, but was rediscovered in 2014 and returned to Japan	
Miss Fukiko Akita		Detroit Children's Museum, Detroit, Michigan			
Miss Aomori		Private collection		Bought by current owner in 1963 from an antiques dealer.	
Miss Chiba	Riverside, California	Unknown			
Miss Chosen		Brauer Museum of Art, Valparaiso, Indiana			
Miss Dai Nippon (Miss Japan)		Department of Anthropology, National Museum of Natural History, Smithsonian Institution, Washington, D.C.			
Miss Ehime		Gulfport, Mississippi		Destroyed in Hurricane Camille (1969) and replaced in 1988	
Miss Fukui	Salt Lake City	Unknown			
Miss Fukuoka	Brooklyn, New York City	Jordan Schnitzer Museum of Art, Eugene, Oregon		Formerly known as Miss Gunma. Gifted to the Jordan Schnitzer Museum in 1972.	
Miss Fukushima	Houston, Texas	National Museum of Toys and Miniatures, Kansas City, Missouri			
Miss Gifu		Cleveland Museum of Art, Cleveland, Ohio		Repaired in Gifu Prefecture in 1995	
Miss Gunma		Morikami Museum and Japanese Gardens, Delray Beach, Florida			
Miss Hiroko Hiroshima		Barry Art Museum, Norfolk, Virginia		Recovered in 1997. The Baltimore Museum of Art also has a Friendship Doll named Miss Hiroshima; this is thought to actually be the original Miss Yamaguchi	
Miss Hokkaido		Putnam Museum of History and Natural Science, Davenport, Iowa			
Miss Hyogo		St. Joseph Museum, Saint Joseph, Missouri			
Miss Ibaraki (Tsukuba Kasumi)		Milwaukee Public Museum, Milwaukee, Wisconsin		Was put on display again following the 2011 tsunami and earthquake in Japan	
Miss Ishikawa		Montana Historical Society, Helena, Montana			
Miss Iwate		Birmingham Public Library, Birmingham, Alabama			
Miss Kagawa		North Carolina State Museum of Natural Sciences, Raleigh, North Carolina			
Miss Kagoshima		Phoenix Museum of History, Phoenix, Arizona			
Miss Kanagawa	Eugene, Oregon	Unknown			
Miss Kanto-shu	Manchester, New Hampshire	Private collection			
Miss Karafuto				confused with Miss Nagano	
Miss Kobe-shi	Stamford, Connecticut	Unknown			
Miss Kochi	Wilkinsburg, Pennsylvania	Carnegie Museum of Natural History, Pittsburgh, Pennsylvania			
Miss Kumamoto	New Orleans, Louisiana	Unknown			
Miss Kyoto-fu		Boston Children's Museum, Boston, Massachusetts			
Miss Kyoto-shi	Museum of Discovery, Little Rock, Arkansas			After being removed from exhibit during World War, was returned to display in 1953. Restored in 2012.	
Miss Mie		University of Nebraska State Museum in Lincoln, Nebraska			
Miss Miyagi		Private collection in Kansas			
Miss Miyazaki	Hennepin County Library in Minneapolis, Minnesota	Minnesota Historical Society, Saint Paul, Minnesota		Given to the Minnesota Historical Society in 2016; restored in Tokyo in 2017	
Miss Nagano	Providence, Rhode Island	Delaware Historical Society in Wilmington, Delaware		Thought to be Miss Karafuto until 1996. Repaired in Japan in 2004	
Miss Nagasaki (Tamako)		Rochester Museum and Science Center in Rochester, New York			
Miss Nagoya-shi		Atlanta History Center, Atlanta, Georgia			
Miss Nara		Idaho Historical Museum, Boise, Idaho		Repaired in Japan in 1994 and returned to Idaho with a 'sister' doll, New Miss Nara. In return, Idaho sent a friendship doll named LaTis Kuts Kuts to Japan, dressed in Native American clothing	
Miss Oita		Springfield Science Museum in Springfield, Massachusetts			
Miss Okayama	Valley City, North Dakota	North Dakota State University Textile Collection in Fargo, North Dakota (since 1973)		Repaired in Japan in 2001 and 2020	
Miss Okinawa		Cincinnati Art Museum in Cincinnati, Ohio			
Miss Marika Osaka-fu	Newark, New Jersey	Ohio Historical Society in Columbus, Ohio			
Miss Osaka-shi	Newark Museum in Newark, New Jersey			Was sent to the United States with a "little brother" doll	
Miss Saga	Philadelphia, Pennsylvania	Unknown			
Miss Saitama		Charleston Museum in Charleston, South Carolina			
Miss Shiga	Miami, Florida	Unknown			
Miss Shimane		Children's Museum of Indianapolis in Indianapolis			
Miss Shizuoka		Kansas City Museum in Kansas City, Missouri			
Miss Taiwan		Natural History Museum of Los Angeles County in Los Angeles, California			
Miss Tochigi	Charleston, West Virginia	Unknown			
Miss Tokushima		Northwest Museum of Arts and Culture in Spokane, Washington			
Miss Tokyo-fu	Richmond, Virginia	Unknown			
Miss Tokyo-shi	New York City, New York	Unknown			
Miss Tottori	Topeka, Kansas	Museum of the South Dakota State Historical Society in Pierre, South Dakota		Originally known as Miss Miyagi	
Miss Toyama		Speed Art Museum in Louisville, Kentucky			
Miss Wakayama		Nevada Historical Society in Reno, Nevada			
Miss Yamagata	Maine	Maine State Museum in Augusta, Maine		Was loaned to Japan in 1988-1989	
Miss Yamaguchi	Chicago, Illinois	Museum of International Folk Art in Santa Fe, New Mexico			
Miss Yamanashi		Wyoming State Museum in Cheyenne, Wyoming			
Miss Yokohama-shi	Denver Public Library, Denver Colorado	Denver Museum of Miniatures, Dolls and Toys, Denver, Colorado		Entrusted to Denver Museum of Miniatures, Dolls and Toys after being restored	
	San Francisco, California	Unknown			

== Legacy ==
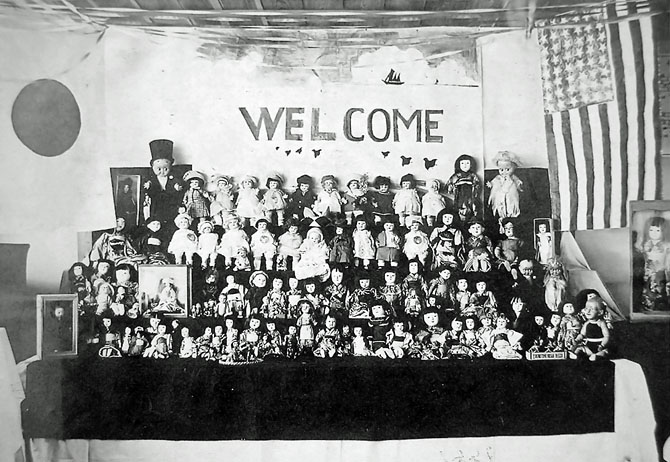
American blue-eyed dolls for Japanese children and Japanese return gift dolls for American children in Kōnosu, Saitama Prefecture

Denny Gulick, grandson of Sidney, has tried to revive the doll exchange idea.

In 2012, American novelist Kirby Larson published a novel called The Friendship Doll, which followed Miss Kanagawa during her tour across the United States.

== See also ==
- Kokeshi doll, a similar concept
