= Pearce–McAllister Cottage =

Historic house in Colorado, United States

- U.S. National Register of Historic Places
- Colorado State Register of Historic Properties
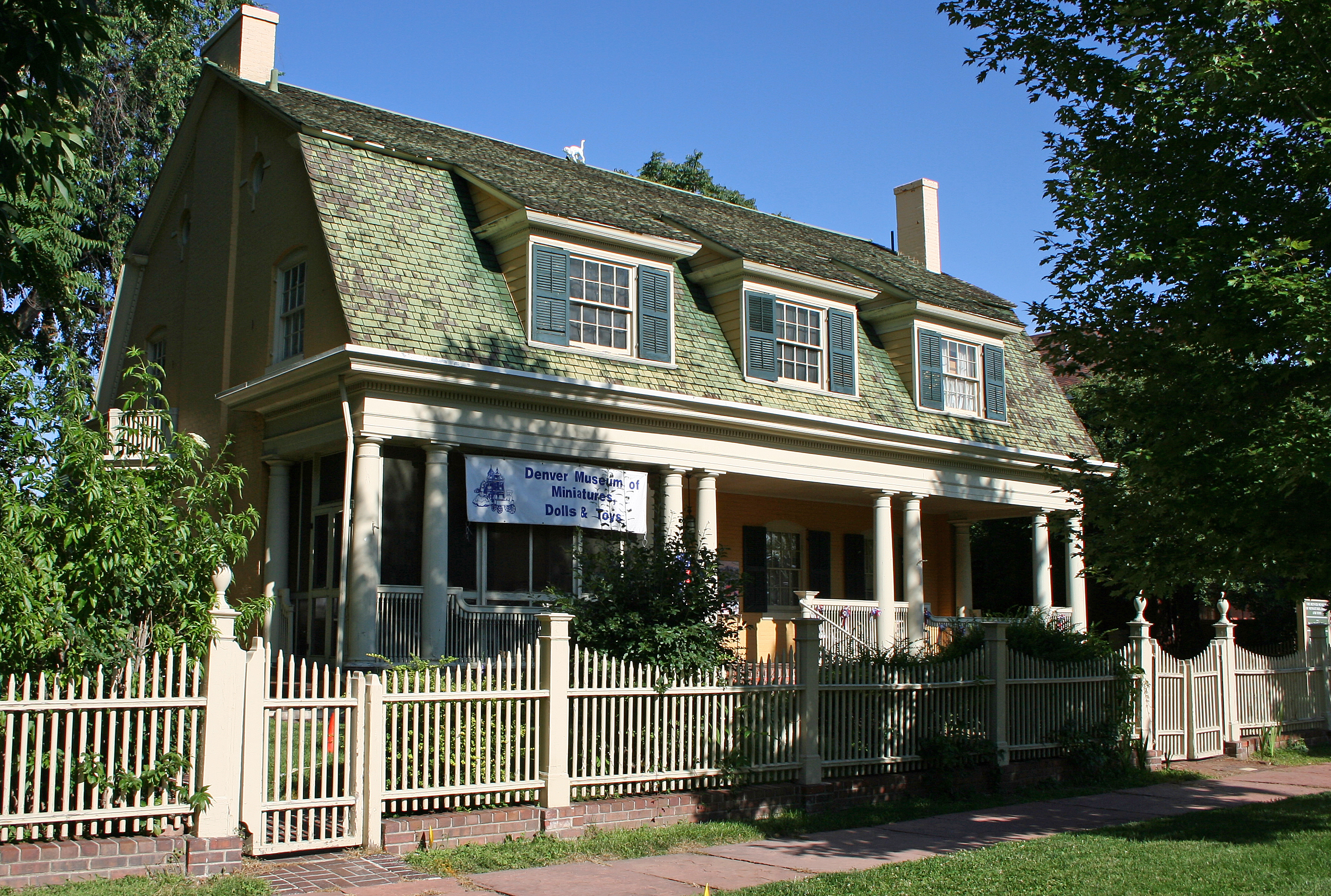

- Location within Colorado Location within the United States
- Location: 1880 Gaylord St., Denver, Colorado
- Coordinates: 39°44′46″N 104°57′37″W
- Area: 0.3 acres (0.12 ha)
- Built: 1900
- Architect: Sterner, Frederick J.
- Architectural style: Late 19th And 20th Century Revivals, Dutch Colonial
- NRHP reference No.: 72000271
- CSRHP No.: 5DV.126
- Added to NRHP: June 20, 1972

The Pearce–McAllister Cottage is a former historic house museum in the City Park West neighborhood of northeast Denver, Colorado, United States. It is administered by History Colorado (the Colorado Historical Society).

The cottage was built in 1899 in the Dutch Colonial Revival style. The Denver-based architect Frederick Sterner built the house for Harold V. Pearce and his wife, Cara Rowena Bell Pearce. The second owners, the McAllisters, remodeled the interior in the 1920s and this is how the cottage is now presented.

The Pearce–McAllister Cottage was home to the Denver Museum of Miniatures, Dolls and Toys until 2018. The collection includes more than 20,000 objects from 1680 onwards.

The house was listed on the US National Register of Historic Places in 1972.

== See also ==
- National Register of Historic Places listings in Northeast Denver, Colorado
