= Denver Museum of Miniatures, Dolls and Toys =

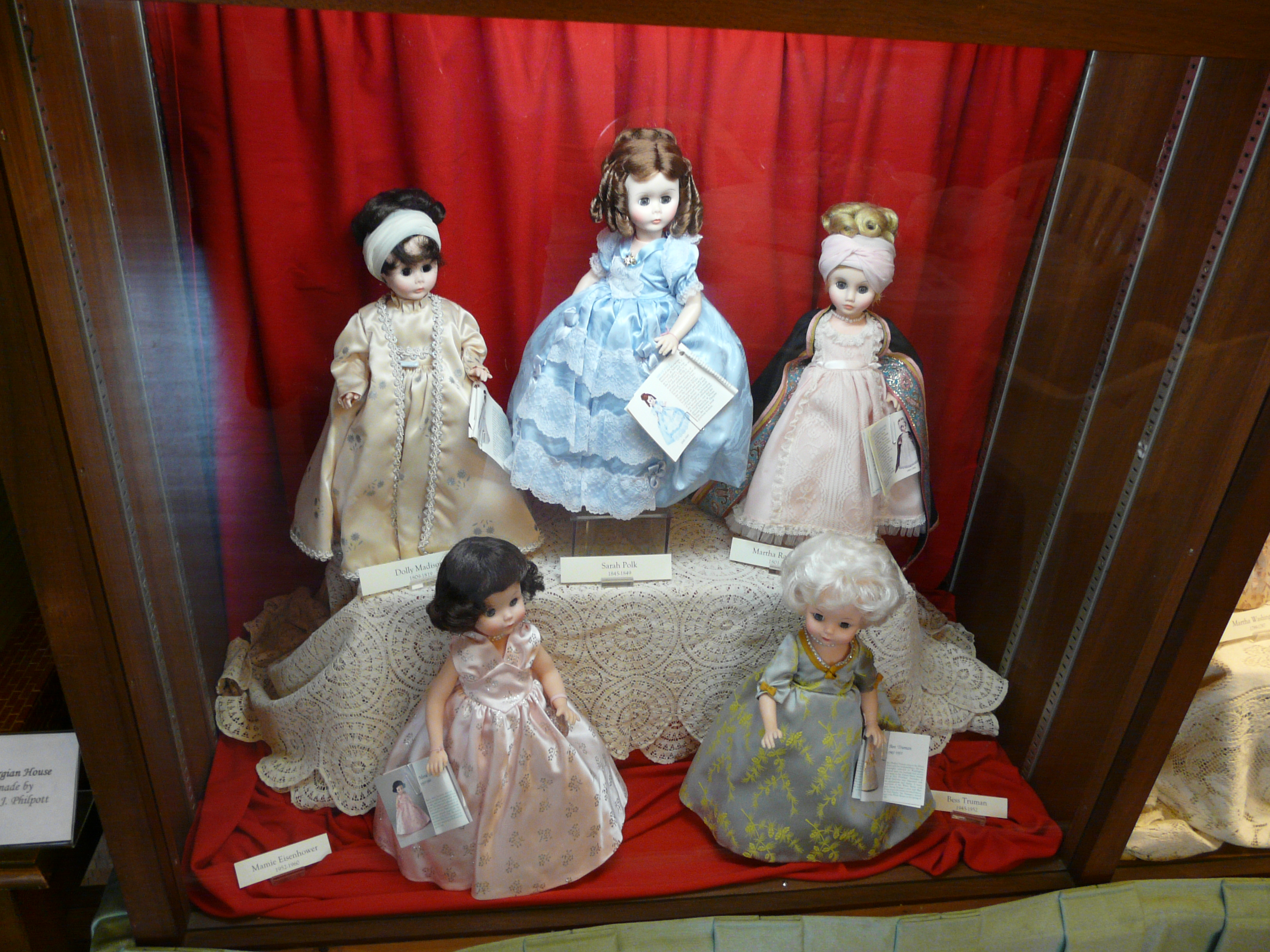
- Madame Alexander dolls on display
- Established: 1981
- Location: 830 Kipling St. Lakewood; Lakewood, Colorado
- Coordinates: 39°43′48.54″N 105°6′32.72″W
- Type: Toy museum
- Website: www.dmmdt.org

The Denver Museum of Miniatures, Dolls and Toys is a private, non-profit museum that is located in Lakewood, Colorado.

The museum was founded in 1981. In 1987, the museum opened at its first location in cooperation with the Colorado Historical Society within the Pearce-McAllister Cottage. The collection of the museum includes more than 20,000 objects dating from 1680 onwards. In 2020, the Museum moved to its new location in Lakewood, Colorado. Its address is 830 Kipling St. Lakewood, Colorado 80215.

== See also ==
- List of museums in Colorado
