= Rocky Mountain Quilt Museum =

Textile museum in Colorado, U.S.

Rocky Mountain Quilt Museum (RMQM)
- Established: 1990
- Location: 200 Violet Street, Ste 140 & 150, Golden, Colorado
- Coordinates: 39.7553°N 105.22121°W
- Type: Quilt, Art
- Website: rmqm.org

The Rocky Mountain Quilt Museum (RMQM) is a cultural and historical quilt museum in Golden, Colorado. The permanent collection contains over 800 quilts dating back to the 19th century. The museum is also home to the Sandra Dallas Library and a quilt/gift shop.

The museum is an independent nonprofit institution with approximately eight staff members, more than 100 volunteers, and a seven-member Board of Directors.

== Exhibits and collections ==
The Rocky Mountain Quilt Museum's permanent collection houses over 800 quilts. These quilts range from early 1800s to contemporary art quilts and include the 101 pieces from Eugenia Mitchell's (founder) original donation. The collection is continuously expanding. The collection is available to search online through the Quilt Index.

The museum hosts four exhibits per year in its two galleries as well as regular smaller exhibits from the RMQM collection, traveling exhibitions, call for entries or individual quilt artists. RMQM has exhibited local, national and international quilts and exhibits range in scope from historic quilts to modern and art quilts.

== Sandra Dallas Library ==
Sandra Dallas Library

RMQM's Sandra Dallas Library contains more than 7,500 items – books, pamphlets, DVDs, and videos – covering a wide range of quilt-related subjects, from history to fiction to patterns and techniques. The library is a self-supporting facility staffed entirely by volunteers. The public is welcome to visit the library to browse the collection and do research. RMQM members may borrow materials from the circulating collection. The Online Catalog is available for online browsing.

== Education ==
RMQM offers various adult and youth education programs and classes each year.

== See also ==
- List of museums in Colorado
- Quilt art
- Quilt Index
- Sandra Dallas
