= Colorado History Museum =

Museum in Denver, Colorado, United States

Coordinates: 39.737431°N 104.98678°W

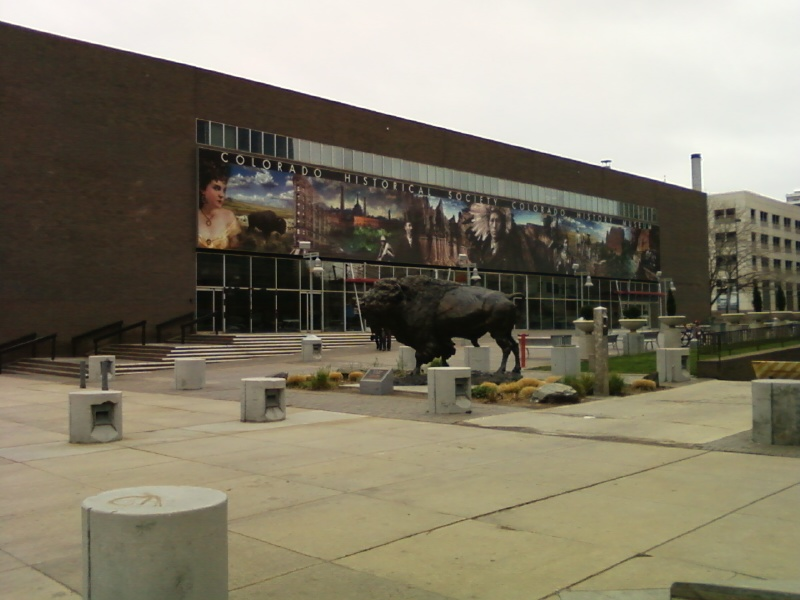
Colorado History Museum, Denver, US

The Colorado History Museum was a museum in Denver, Colorado, United States, dedicated to the history of Colorado. It was at 1300 Broadway in Denver from 1976 to 2010, and was administered by the Colorado Historical Society, now known as History Colorado. It closed on 28 March 2010, and the building was demolished in June to make way for a new Colorado Judicial Complex. The replacement museum, the History Colorado Center, was constructed one block to the south.

== See also ==
- History of Colorado
