= List of historical societies in Colorado =

The following is a list of historical societies in the state of Colorado, United States.

== Organizations ==
- Adams County Historical Society
- Aspen Historical Society
- Aurora Historical Society
- Bessemer Historical Society in Pueblo
- Boulder Historical Society and Museum
- Castle Rock Historical Society
- Old Colorado City Historical Society
- Columbine Genealogical And Historical Society
- Delta County Historical Society
- Eagle County Historical Society
- East Yuma County Historical Society
- Elbert County Historical Society
- Erie Historical Society
- Frisco Historical Society
- Frontier Historical Society
- Gilpin County Historical Society
- Grand County Historical Society
- Grand Lake Area Historical Society
- Grand Valley Historical Society
- High Plains Historical Society
- Hinsdale County Historical Society
- History Colorado (Colorado Historical Society)
- Hotchkiss-Crawford Historical Society
- Historical Society of Idaho Springs
- Huerfano County Historical Society
- Johnstown Historical Society
- La Plata County Historical Society
- Lafayette Historical Society
- Leadville Heritage Museum Association
- Littleton Historical Society
- Logan County Historical Society
- Longmont Genealogical Society
- Marble Historical Society And Museum
- Mesa County Historical Society
- Mill Creek Valley Historical Society
- Milliken Historical Society
- Montrose County Historical Society
- Nederland Area Historical Society
- Historical Society Of Oak Creek And Phippsburg
- Otero County Historical Society
- Ouray County Historical Society
- Phillips County Historical Society
- Pikes Peak Historical Society
- Prowers County Historical Society
- Pueblo County Historical Society
- Red Feather Historical Society
- Rio Grande County Historical Society
- Rocky Mountain Jewish Historical Society
- San Juan County Historical Society
- Sedgewick County Genealogical Society
- Sheridan Historical Society
- Silt Historical Society
- South Park Historical Society
- Southeastern Colorado Historical Society
- St. Vrain Historical Society
- Summit Historical Society
- Surface Creek Valley Historical Society
- Telluride Historical Society
- Trinidad History Society
- Ute Pass Historical Society
- Westminster Historical Society

== See also ==
- History of Colorado
- List of museums in Colorado
- National Register of Historic Places listings in Colorado
- List of historical societies in the United States
