= Cross Orchards Historic Site =

Coordinates: 39°05′28″N 108°29′01″W

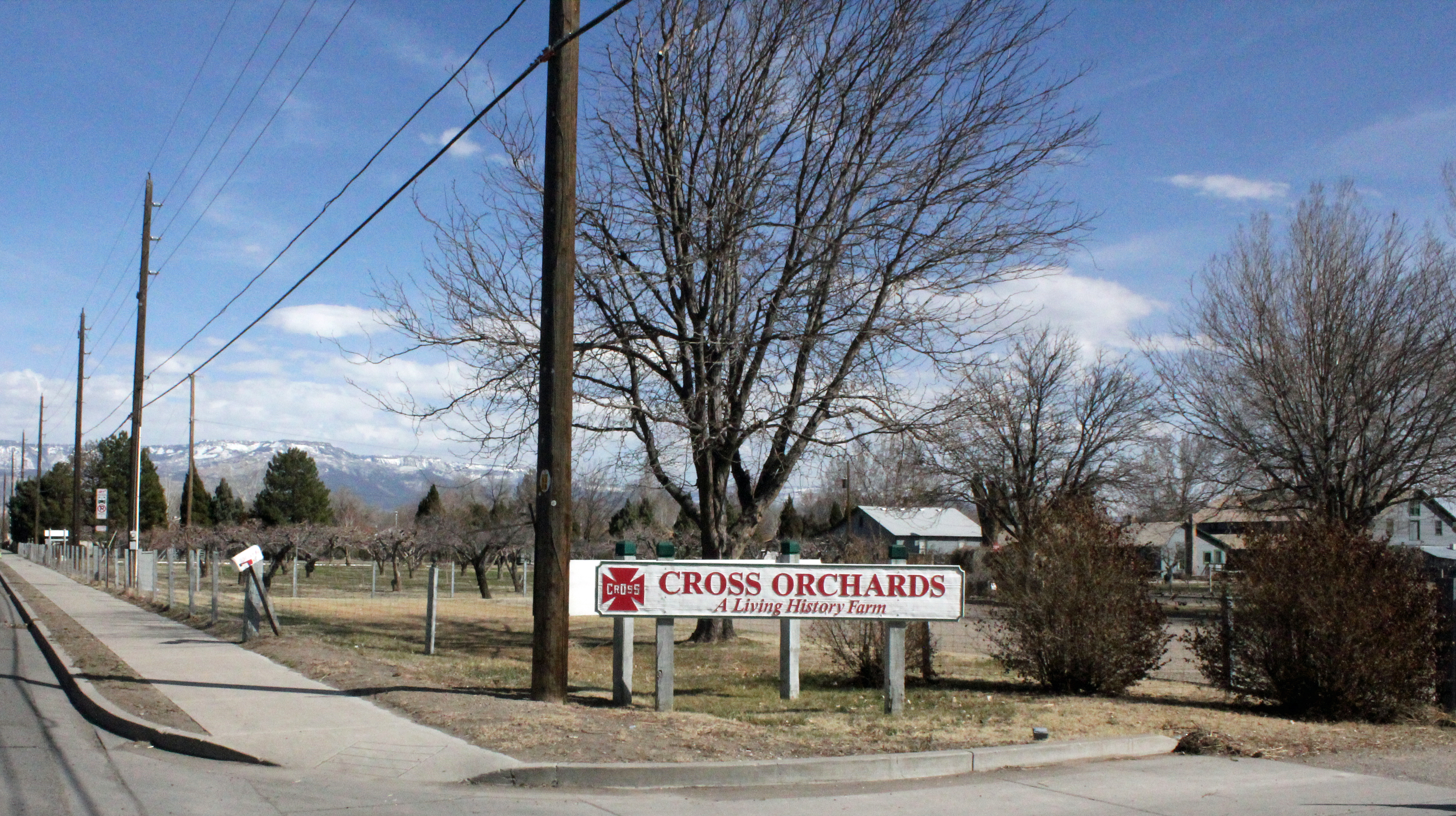
- The site in 2013
- Former name: Cross Orchards Living History Site, Cross Orchards Living Museum
- Location: Grand Junction, Colorado, US
- Type: History museum
- Website: museumofwesternco.com/cross-orchards/

Cross Orchards Historic Site is a living history museum located in Grand Junction, Colorado. It is part of the Museums of Western Colorado. It was added to the National Register of Historic Places in 1980. The Orchards are known for showing how life was on an orchard at the turn of the twentieth century and is considered living history as it is still worked and cultivated regularly. It features a workers' bunkhouse, blacksmith shop, an apple orchard, and a collection of vintage farming equipment. The site includes farm equipment, implements and tools, a period farmhouse, a recreated train depot and Uintah Railway exhibit with railroad cars, an engine and caboose, and historic horse-drawn road-building equipment. It is also home to the largest collection of Uintah Railway cars on the Colorado western slope.

At its peak the orchard produced 22,000 apple trees over a 243-acre (0.98 km^{2}) orchard. It is considered the largest orchard for the time in western Colorado. The only land left today is now a 24-acre (97,000 m^{2}) site. The farm is also known to feature celebrations at harvest time where they show the public how apple cider was made.
