= Frisco, Colorado =

Town in Colorado, United States

- Home rule municipality
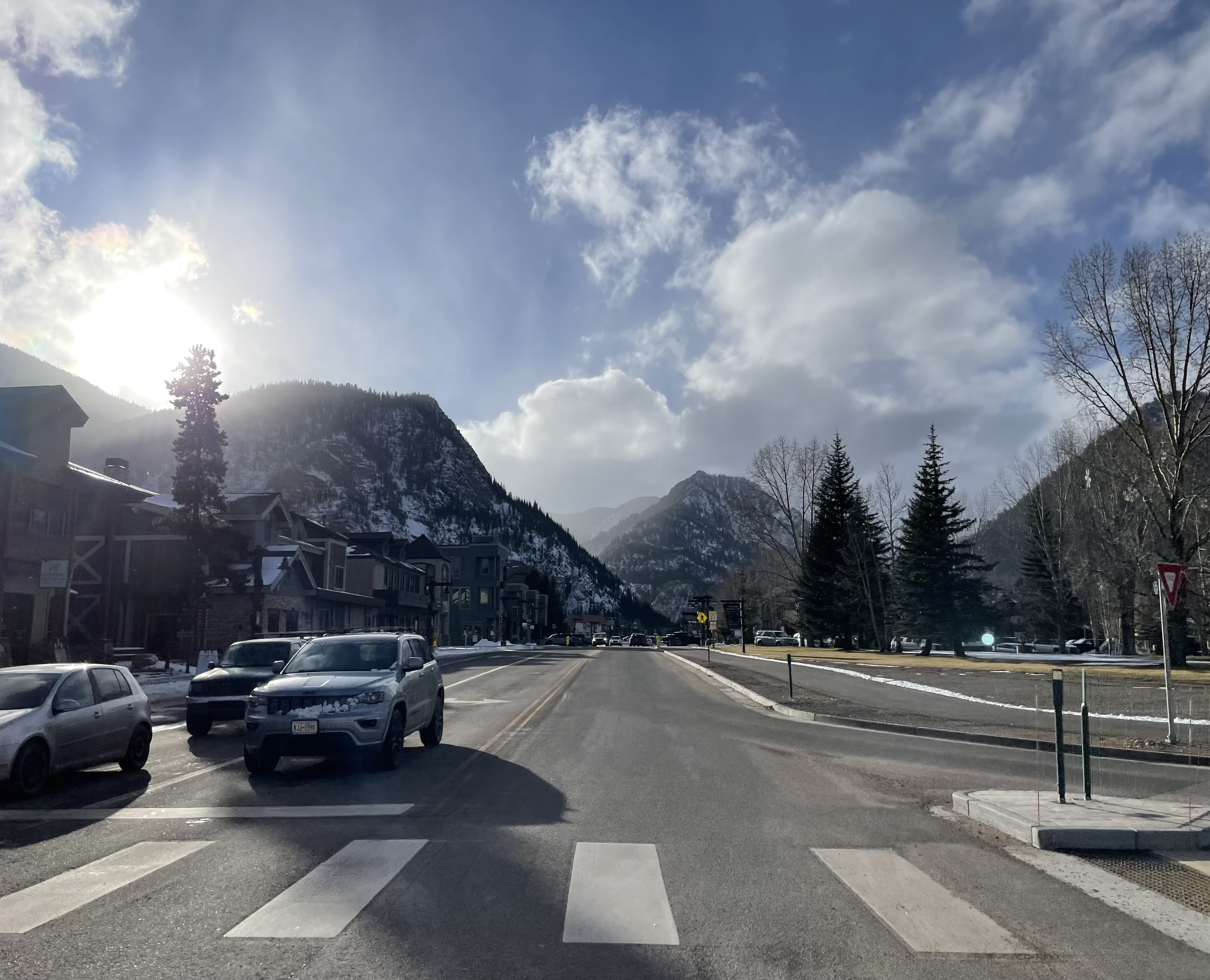
- Frisco, Colorado

- Flag Logo
- Motto: "Main Street of the Rockies"
- Location of the Town of Frisco in Summit County, Colorado
- Coordinates: 39°34′45″N 106°05′29″W
- Country: United States
- State: Colorado
- County: Summit
- Founded: 1873
- Incorporated: December 3, 1880

Area
  - Total: 1.777 sq mi (4.602 km^{2})
  - Land: 1.670 sq mi (4.326 km^{2})
  - Water: 0.107 sq mi (0.278 km^{2})
- Elevation: 9,026 ft (2,751 m)

Population (2020)
  - Total: 2,913
  - Density: 1,679/sq mi (648.2/km^{2})
- Time zone: UTC–7 (Central (MST))
  - Summer (DST): UTC–6 (MDT)
- ZIP Code: 80443
- Area code: 970
- FIPS code: 08-28690
- GNIS feature ID: 2412661
- Website: townoffrisco.com

Frisco is a home rule municipality located in Summit County, Colorado, United States. The population was 2,913 at the 2020 census. Frisco is a part of the Breckenridge, CO Micropolitan Statistical Area. It is a popular town among skiers from around the world. Four major ski resorts are located in close proximity to Frisco: Copper Mountain, Breckenridge, Keystone, and Arapahoe Basin.

== History ==
Founded in 1873 (and officially chartered in 1879) by Henry Recen, Frisco was built because of the Colorado Silver Boom, which began in 1879. Frisco was incorporated on December 3, 1880. The town's name comes not from San Francisco, California but, rather, the St. Louis–San Francisco Railway, commonly known as the Frisco, in an attempt to lure the rail line to the town. (Frisco, Texas, is also named after the railroad.)

At one point Summit became the sixth wealthiest county in the United States, however by 2025 wealth inequality and housing costs in the Frisco area had become so extreme that many workers there, ranging from ski instructors to emergency room nurses, were forced into homelessness even despite continuing to maintain their jobs. Homeless employees of local ski resorts are permitted to sleep in their cars in local lots only if they can prove their employment.

== Geography ==
According to the United States Census Bureau, the town has a total area of 1.777 square miles (4.60 km^{2}), of which 1.670 square miles (4.33 km^{2}) is land and 0.107 square miles (0.28 km^{2}), is water.

Frisco is located along the coast of Lake Dillon, a reservoir constructed between 1961 and 1963 that now covers the original town of Dillon. Across the water to the east are the new town of Dillon, Silverthorne, and Keystone. To the southeast is Breckenridge.

== Demographics ==
Historical population
Census	Pop.	Note	%±
1880	48		—
1930	18		—
1940	60		233.3%
1950	87		45.0%
1960	316		263.2%
1970	471		49.1%
1980	1,221		159.2%
1990	1,601		31.1%
2000	2,443		52.6%
2010	2,683		9.8%
2020	2,913		8.6%
2022 (est.)	2,804	▼	−3.7%
U.S. Decennial Census; 2020 Census

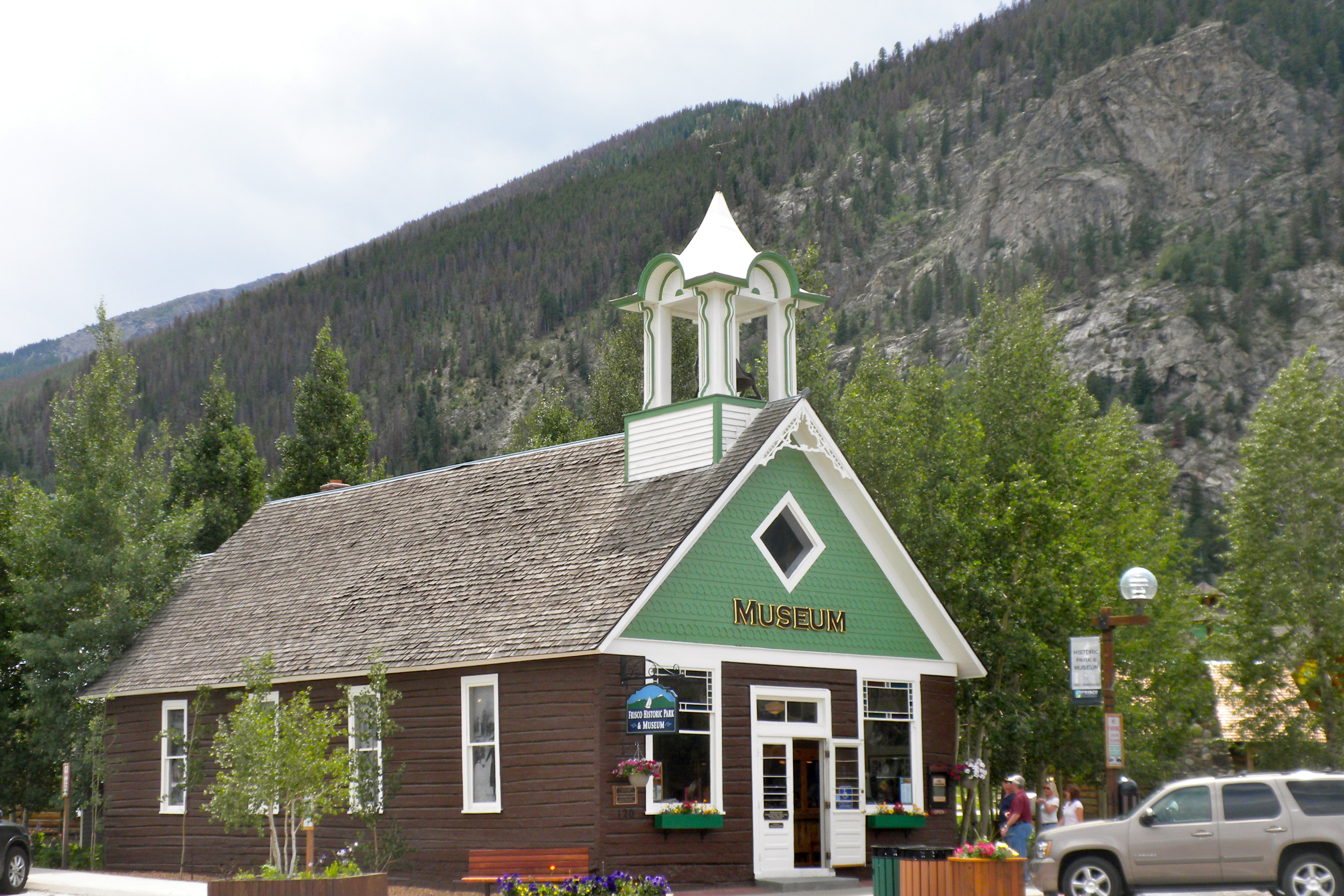
Frisco Schoolhouse

=== 2020 census ===
As of the 2020 census, there were 2,913 people, 1,380 households, and 733 families residing in the town. There were 3,349 housing units.

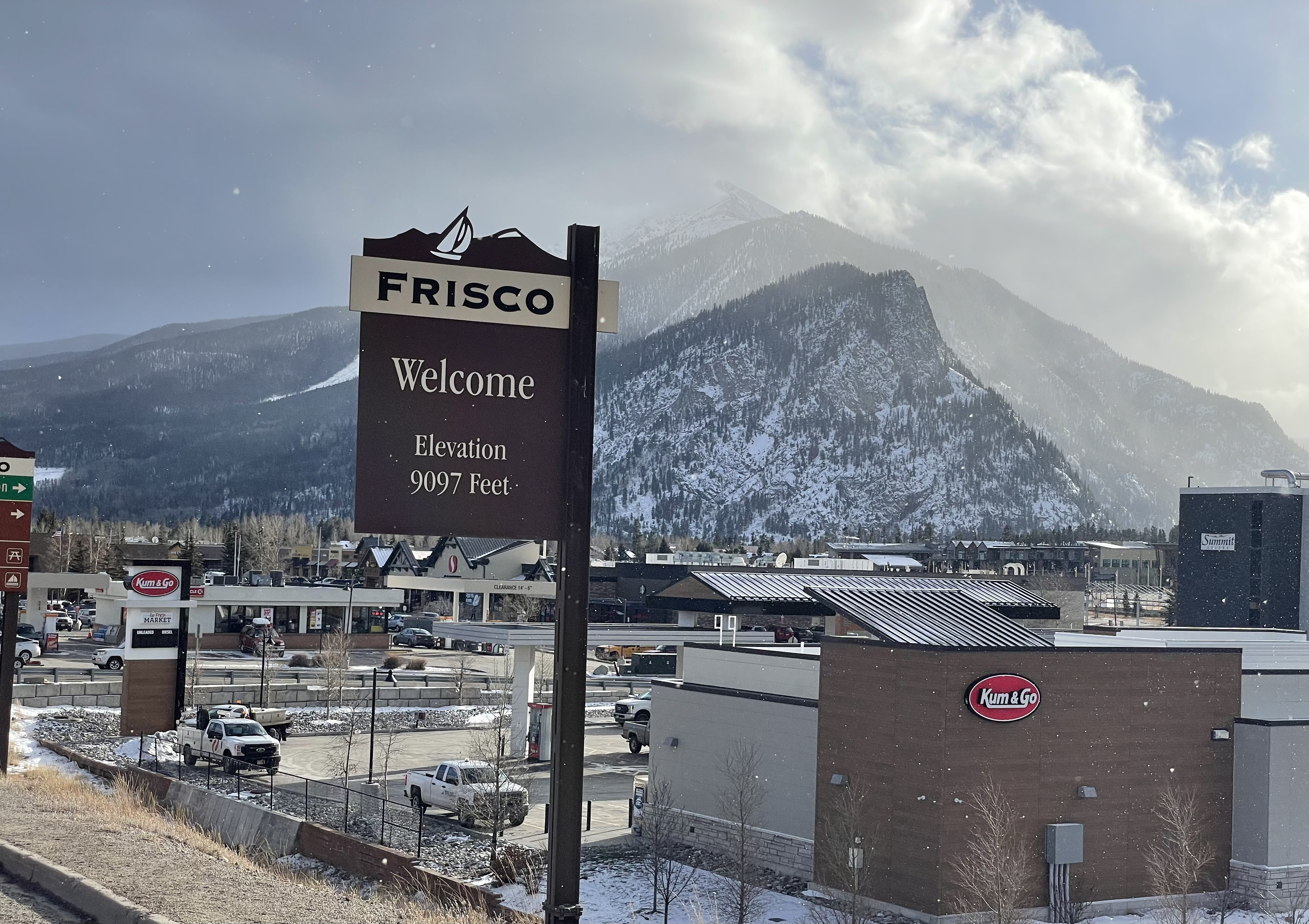
Frisco town signage

=== 2000 census ===
As of the 2000 census, there were 2,443 people, 1,053 households, and 527 families residing in the town. The population density was 1,479.9 inhabitants per square mile (571.4/km^{2}). There were 2,727 housing units at an average density of 1,652.0 per square mile (637.8/km^{2}). The racial makeup of the town was 96.36% White, 0.08% African American, 0.20% Native American, 0.90% Asian, 0.61% from other races, and 1.84% from two or more races. Hispanic or Latino of any race were 3.48% of the population.

There were 1,053 households, out of which 18.1% had children under the age of 18 living with them, 42.7% were married couples living together, 3.7% had a female householder with no husband present, and 49.9% were non-families. 23.9% of all households were made up of individuals, and 2.5% had someone living alone who was 65 years of age or older. The average household size was 2.32 and the average family size was 2.66.

In the town, the population was spread out, with 14.2% under the age of 18, 12.6% from 18 to 24, 44.9% from 25 to 44, 23.2% from 45 to 64, and 5.0% who were 65 years of age or older. The median age was 33 years. For every 100 females, there were 137.6 males. For every 100 females age 18 and over, there were 139.0 males.

The median income for a household in the town was $62,267, and the median income for a family was $70,556. Males had a median income of $36,989 versus $29,766 for females. The per capita income for the town was $31,232. About 1.7% of families and 7.2% of the population were below the poverty line, including 5.0% of those under age 18 and 9.6% of those age 65 and older.

== Arts and culture ==
Frisco was the location of the first official state BBQ challenge in 1993. The event is held annually, and benefits non-profits. In the last fifteen years (to 2012), the event has raised over $500,000. The event moved to Copper Mountain in 2023 and will not continue.

== Infrastructure ==
Intercity transportation is provided by both Bustang and Summit Stage. Frisco is along Bustang's West Line, which goes from Denver to Grand Junction and back. Summit Stage provides free transportation between Silverthorne, Frisco, Breckenridge, and others.

== Notable people ==
- Michelle Black, novelist
- Jon Kreamelmeyer (1947-present), skier, coach

== Sister cities ==
- Nishikawa, Yamagata, Japan - since August 29, 1990

== See also ==
- Dillon Reservoir
- Frisco Schoolhouse in the Frisco Historic Park
- Gore Range
- Tenmile Range
- White River National Forest
