= Wall Street Assay Office =

Boulder County, Colorado historic place

- U.S. National Register of Historic Places
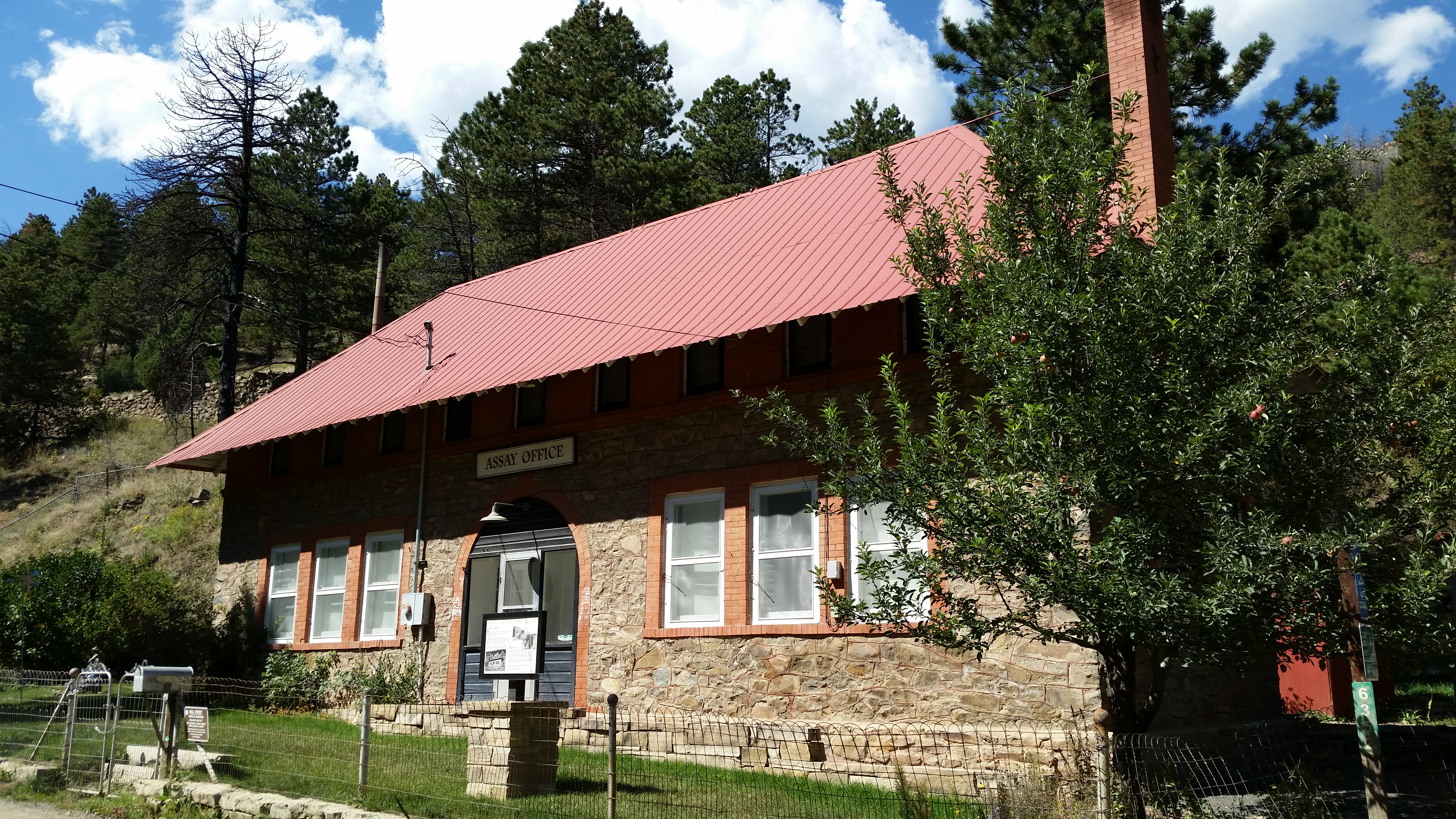
- Wall Street Assay Office

- Location within Colorado Location within the United States
- Location: 6352 Four Mile Canyon Dr., Boulder, Colorado
- Coordinates: 40°2′23.719″N 105°23′24.614″W
- Area: less than one acre
- Built: 1901
- Architectural style: Late 19th And 20th Century Revivals
- MPS: Metal Mining and Tourist Era Resources of Boulder County MPS
- NRHP reference No.: 89000986
- Added to NRHP: August 3, 1989

The Wall Street Assay Office is a historic commercial building related to precious metal mining in the western outskirts of Boulder, Colorado in an area known as Wall Street. Once a thriving mining town in Boulder County's foothills area, Wall Street is now home to a few dozen residential properties scattered among the remnants of the Storm King mine. The Wall Street Assay Office sits on Four Mile Canyon Dr, now preserved as the James F. Bailey Assay Office Museum.

The Wall Street area was home to a variety of metal mining activities in the late 1800s, including a small camp named Delphi. Charles Caryl visited the area in 1889, returned east to raise money, and opened the Gold Extraction Mining and Supply Company in present-day Wall Street in 1897. The Assay Office was constructed along with a store and boarding house, a large mill was built in 1901. The operation failed two years later. The assay office was purchased at a sheriff's sale by James Bailey in 1907. It was used as the office of the Storm King Mine, and later converted into a residence for the Bailey family.
