= Frisco Schoolhouse =

- U.S. National Register of Historic Places
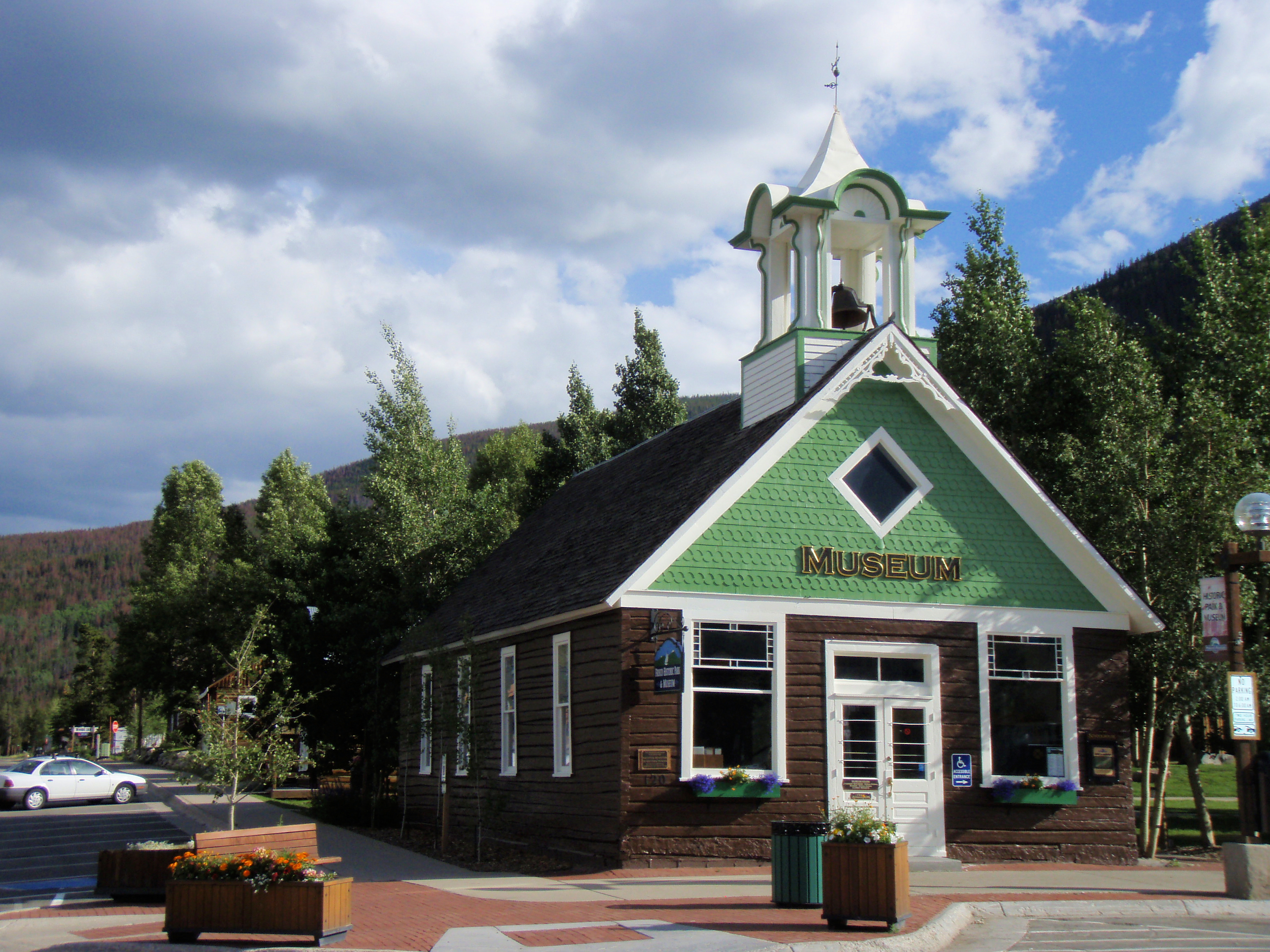
- Frisco Schoolhouse, Frisco Historic Park

- Location within Colorado Location within the United States
- Location: 120 Main Street, Frisco, Colorado
- Coordinates: 39°34′30″N 106°6′0″W
- Area: less than one acre
- Built: c.1902
- MPS: Rural School Buildings in Colorado MPS
- NRHP reference No.: 83001333
- Added to NRHP: September 15, 1983

The Frisco Schoolhouse (Site ID 5ST258), now a local museum registered on the National Register of Historic Places, is an original one-room schoolhouse located in the Frisco Historic Park in Frisco, Colorado. The schoolhouse is located on its original location. The building was first built as a saloon in the 1890s and later (c.1902) converted to a school, which now contains original blackboards and school desks. The museum also contains information about Ute people, Dillon Reservoir, mining, late 1800s clothing, and photographs.

The Frisco Historic Park includes other original Frisco buildings from the late 1800s, including: a log chapel, jail, trapper's cabin and furnished homes.

It was deemed significant for NRHP listing as it is the oldest standing schoolhouse in the town, and was the only school from 1902 to 1940.

== Frisco Schoolhouse ==
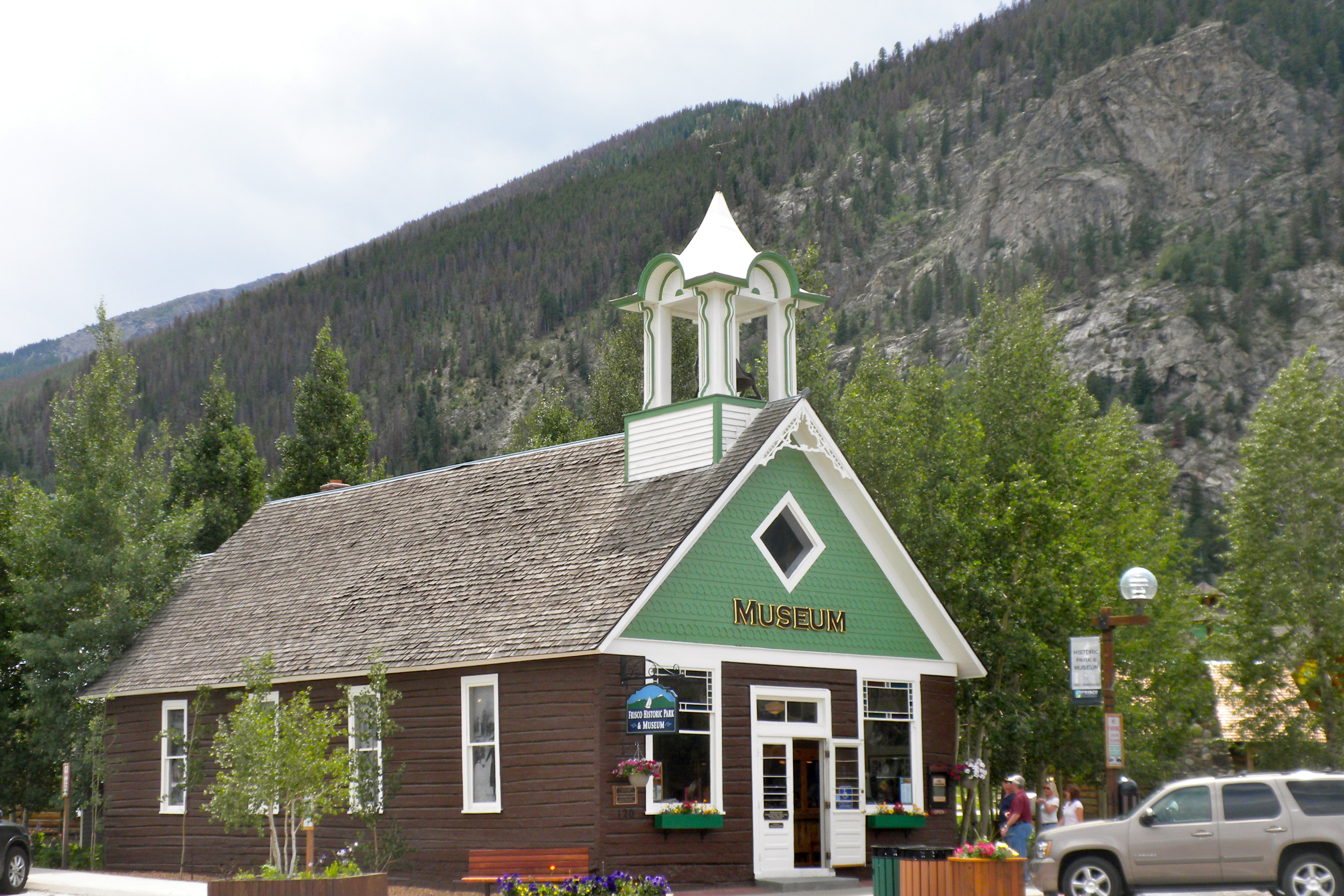
Frisco Schoolhouse

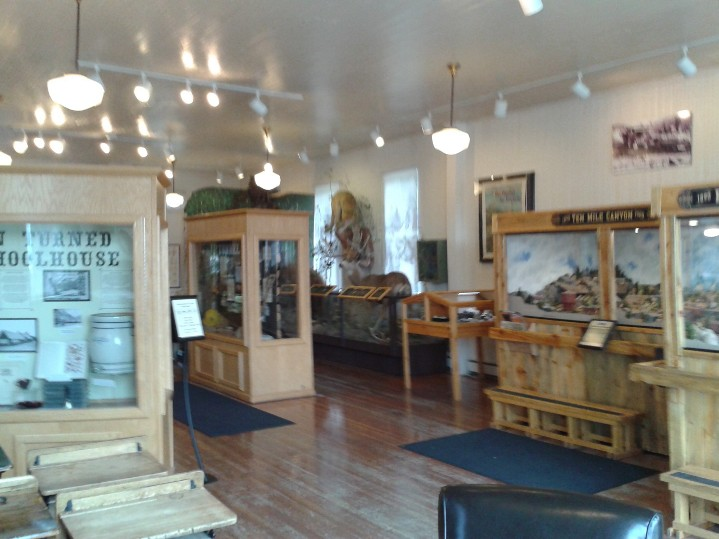
Schoolhouse interior

== Frisco Historic Park ==
In addition to the Frisco Schoolhouse Museum, the Frisco Historic Park includes the following structures:

- Bailey House (c. 1895)
- Bill's Ranch House (c. 1890)
- Frank and Annie Ruth House (c. 1890)
- Frisco Jail (c. 1881)
- Log Chapel (c. 1943)
- Niemoth Cabin (c. 1931)
- Prestrud / Staley House (c. 1899)
- Spring House (c. 1900)
- Trapper's Cabin (c. 1942)
- Wood's Cabin (c. 1860)
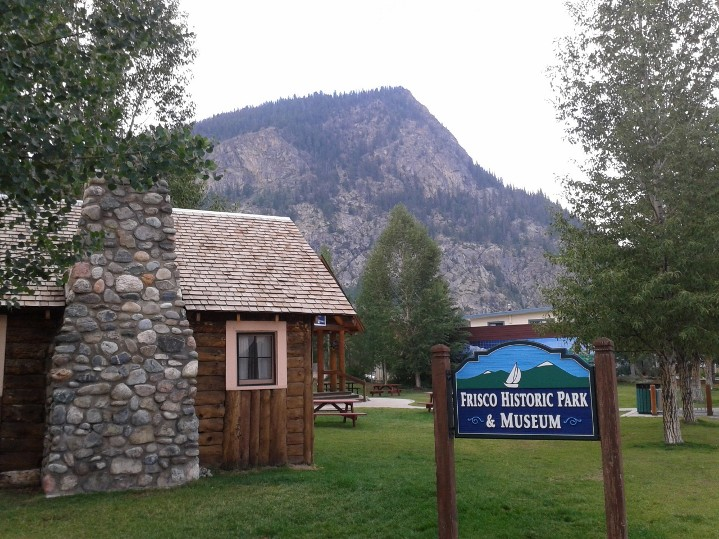
Frisco Historic Park

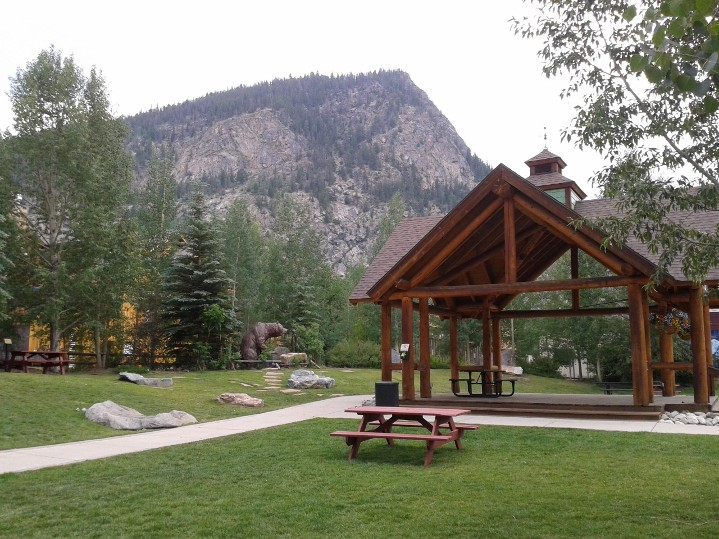
Park and sculpture

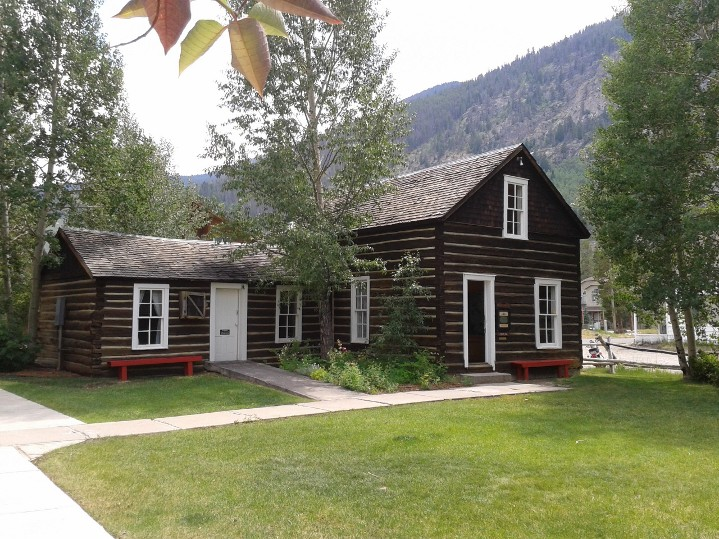
Bailey House

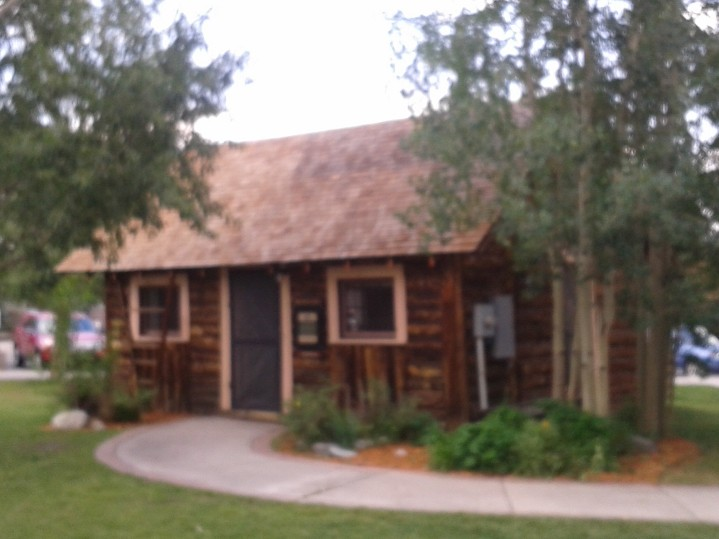
Niemoth Cabin

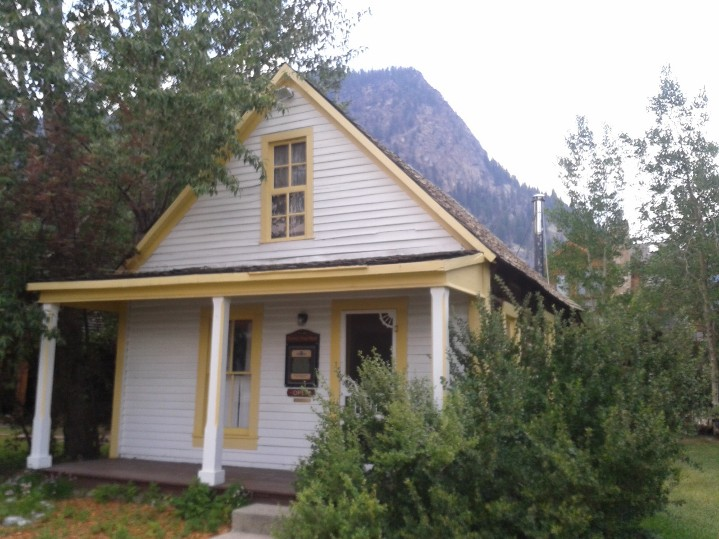
Prestrud Stoley House

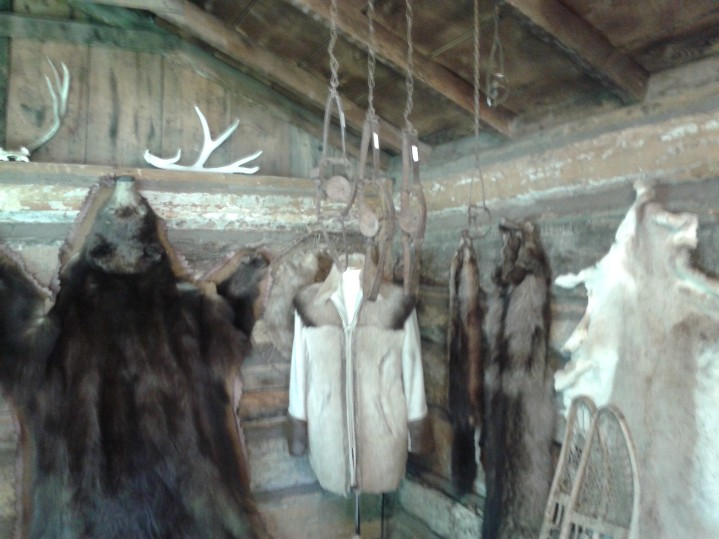
Trapper's Cabin Interior

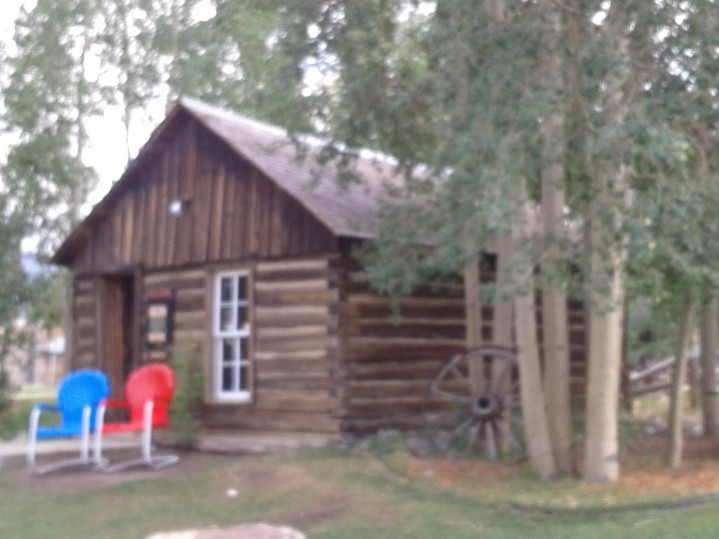
Woods Cabin

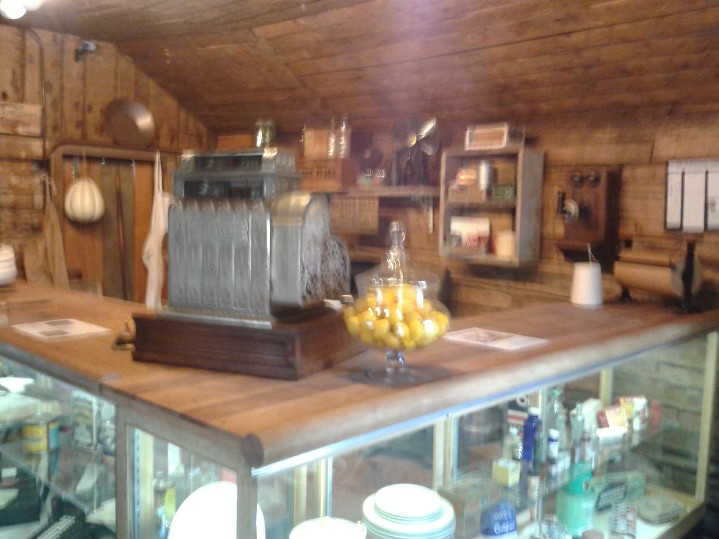
Woods Cabin Interior

== See also ==
- Frisco, Colorado in Summit County, Colorado
- National Register of Historic Places listings in Colorado
