= History Colorado Center =

History museum in Denver, Colorado, US

Colorado History Museum (formerly History Colorado Center)
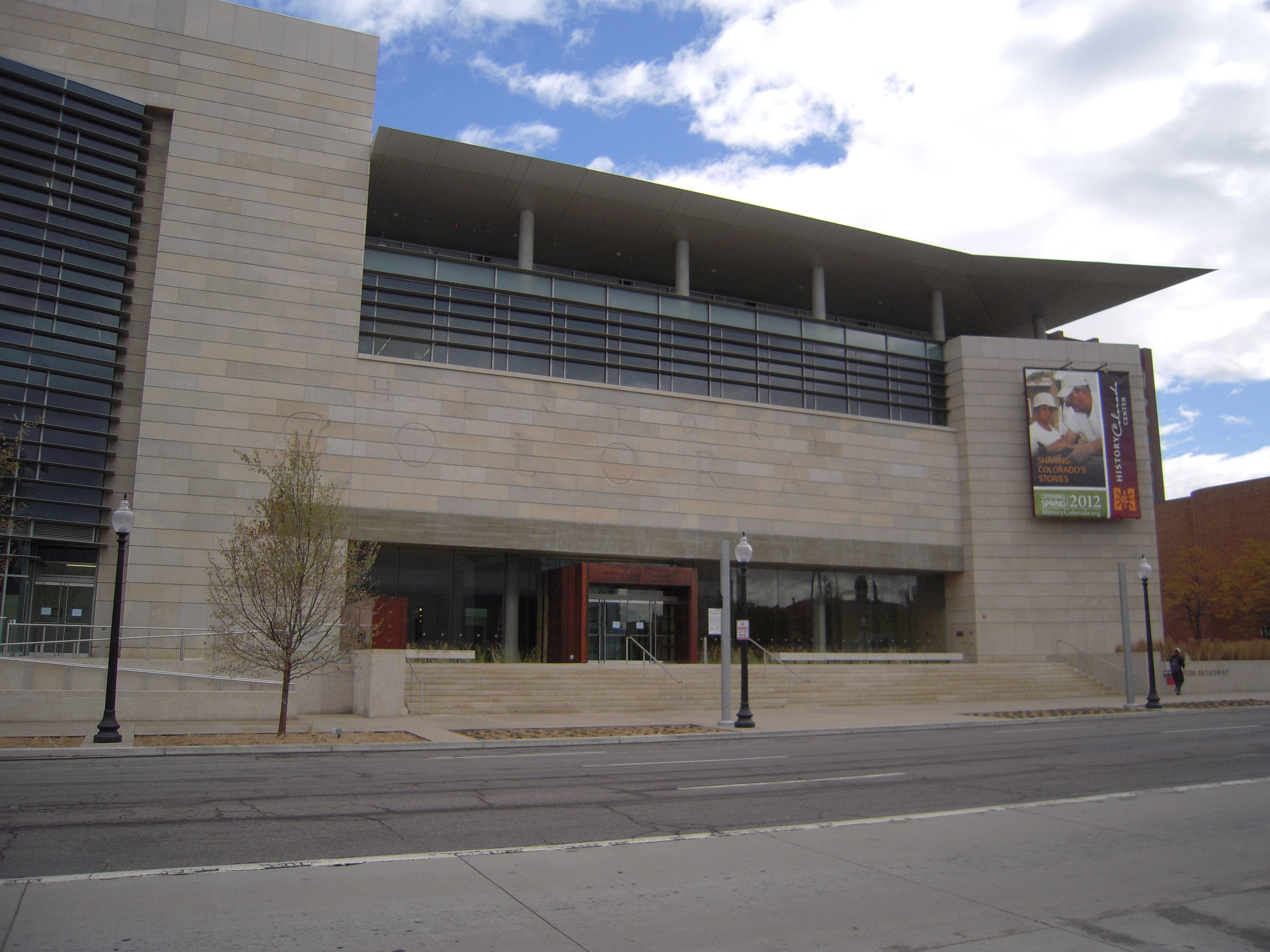
- Established: 2012
- Location: 1200 Broadway; Denver, Colorado
- Coordinates: 39.736099°N 104.986956°W
- Type: History museum
- Owner: History Colorado
- Website: www.historycoloradocenter.org

The Colorado History Museum (formerly History Colorado Center) is a museum in Denver, Colorado, US, dedicated to the history of the state of Colorado. Construction on the $111 million building started on August 19, 2009. The museum opened on 28 April 2012 at 1200 Broadway, one block south of the site of its predecessor, the Colorado History Museum, which closed in 2010. The center is administered by History Colorado, formerly the Colorado Historical Society.

== Research ==
The Stephen H. Hart Library & Research Center provides a collection of artifacts, archives and photography to History of Colorado's Collection.

Collections consists of maps, clothing, teapots, photography dating from the 1850s, and news paper collections containing marriage, birth, and death records.

== Permanent Exhibits ==
The Colorado History Museum (formerly History Colorado Center) features six permanent exhibits: Living West, Colorado Stories, Denver A-Z, Destination Colorado, Time Machine, and Denver Diorama. All exhibits feature hands-on opportunities for childhood learning and interesting displays for adults.

=== Living West ===
The Living West exhibit is a 7,000 square foot exhibit that explores the living dynamics between the people of Colorado and their state's environment. The exhibit is divided into three areas which focus on different environmental regions at different times in Colorado's history. The importance of water is a theme that runs throughout each area of the exhibit. The three exhibit areas of Living West include Mesa Verde (western Colorado), the Dust Bowl (the plains), and the Mountains.

=== Mesa Verde ===
Mesa Verde focuses on the daily lives of the Ancestral Puebloans. The exhibit features dioramas and artifacts including pottery and tools.

=== Dust Bowl ===
In this section, museum visitors can experience the Black Sunday storm of the 1930s and see what hardships the Dust Bowl offered homesteading Coloradans.

=== Mountains ===
In this exhibit area, visitors can marvel at some of the wildlife Colorado's mountains have to offer as well as see how roads and rivers through the mountains have shaped life everywhere in the state. Using a hands-on water diorama and trees affected by the mountain pine beetle as examples, the museum illustrates just how important preserving Colorado's resources is.

=== Destination Colorado ===
Destination Colorado focuses on the former town of Keota, Colorado, which has since become unincorporated. The town, established in 1880, is described as the iconic homesteading mecca that faced drought and famine but was also filled with kindness and community. The trip through the exhibit is narrated by several actors portraying real residents of Keota as it winds through the general store and school, among other places. Some of Keota's residences and many of their relatives are still alive today.

=== Colorado Stories ===
Colorado Stories takes an in-depth look at some of the people that have shaped Colorado's history and made it the state it is today. Highlights include a ski jump simulator and a short video on loop depicting the struggles faced by internees at the Granada War Relocation Center, an internment camp in Southeastern Colorado used to house Japanese-Americans after the attack on Pearl Harbor. A walk-through exhibit area shows the cramped conditions in the internees' quarters. Other exhibits include a Silverton, Colorado silver mine, a look at rangers working in Rocky Mountain National Park and a section that explores the various triumphs and hardships experienced by Colorado's African-Americans.

=== Time Machine ===
Upon entering the museum, guests are greeted by a 40 by 60-foot map of the state of Colorado. The map was designed by renowned artist Steven Weitzman using a revolutionary type of concrete tiles he designed himself. When visitors move a large "steam punk" style time machine over certain areas on the map, screens on the machine come to life and go back in time to relay fascinating stories from different periods in that area's history.

=== Denver A-Z ===
This exhibit focuses on the capital of Denver. A journey through the alphabet reveals tidbits about Colorado's most populous city from big blue bears to the city's fascination with zombies.

=== The Denver Diorama ===
A local favorite, the Denver Diorama shows what this major city looked like when it was a small town on the 1800s Colorado plains.

== See also ==
- History of Colorado
