= History Colorado =

Historical society

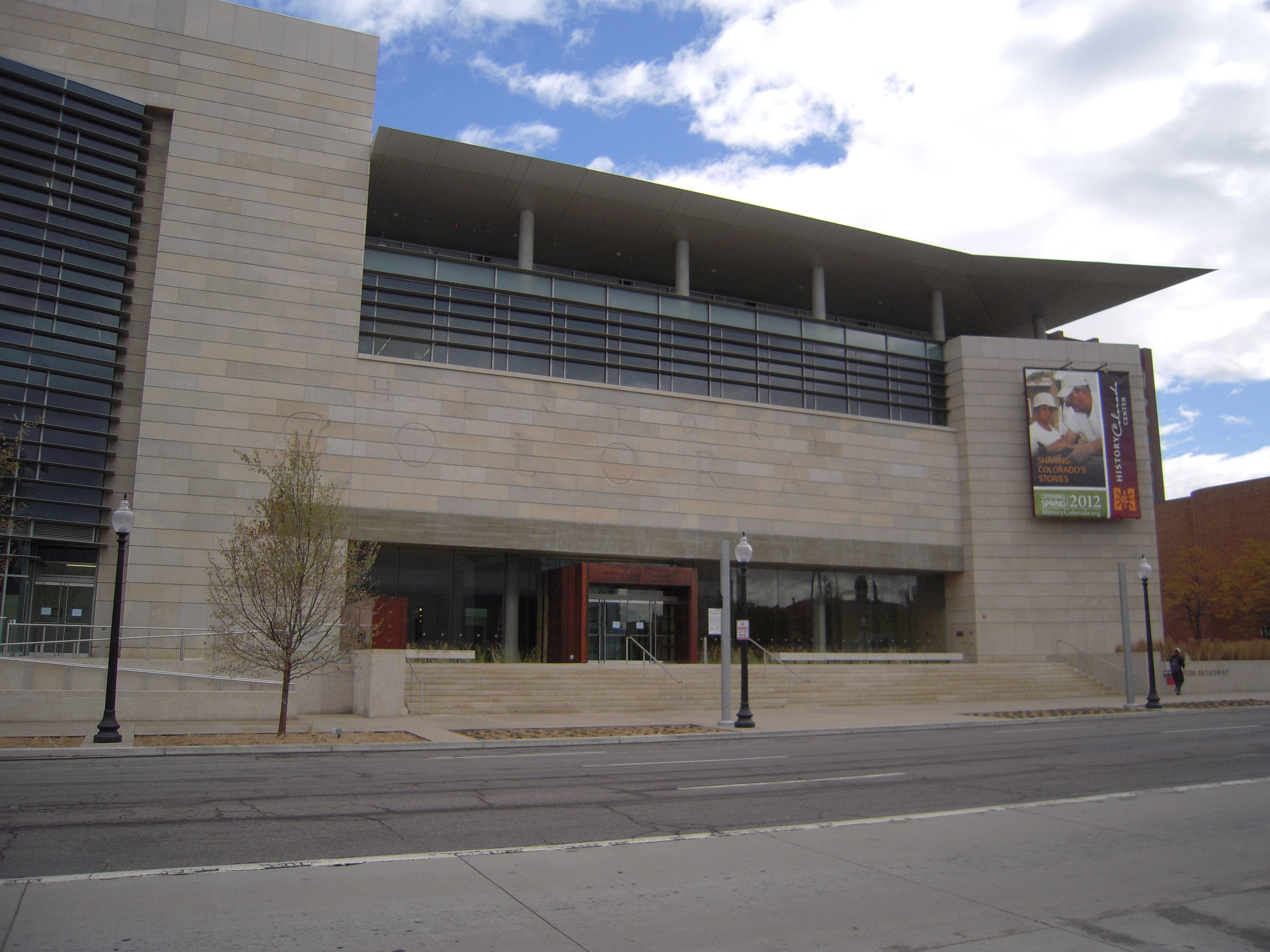
The History Colorado Center in Denver is operated by History Colorado.

History Colorado is a historical society that was established in 1879 as the State Historical Society of Colorado, also known as the Colorado Historical Society. History Colorado is a 501(c)(3) organization and an agency of the State of Colorado under the Department of Higher Education.

== Overview ==
History Colorado offers the public access to cultural and heritage resources of Colorado, including museums and special programs for individuals and families, collection stewardship of Colorado's historic treasures, educational resources for schools, students and teachers, services related to preservation, archaeology and history, and the Stephen H. Hart Research Library.

History Colorado's statewide activities support tourism, historic preservation, education, and research related to Colorado's rich western history, offering the public unique opportunities to interact with Colorado history through its network of museums, which offer both exhibitions and special programs for adults and children.

History Colorado also works with schools across Colorado to provide classrooms and teachers with resources and curriculum related to Colorado history, and offers local communities resources that help them to enrich historical-related community-based programs.

History Colorado publishes the quarterly magazine Colorado Heritage (formerly The Colorado Magazine).

== The History Colorado Center ==
In 2012, the agency opened the new state history museum of Colorado, the History Colorado Center. As History Colorado's headquarters, the History Colorado Center is designed to be a tourist destination, a museum, as well as a center for civic programs and discussion. The building houses core and traveling exhibitions, education/public programs, the Office of Archaeology and Historic Preservation, the State Historical Fund, the Stephen H. Hart Research Library, and other History Colorado functions. Located at 12th and Broadway in Denver's Golden Triangle Museum District, this is a building that was designed and constructed by an all-Colorado team: Tryba Architects, Trammell Crow Company and Hensel Phelps Construction Company. History Colorado is a Smithsonian Affiliate. At the building's April 2012 opening ceremony, Smithsonian Affiliations Director Harold Closter described the History Colorado Center as "the first great history museum of the twenty-first century."

== Preservation programs ==
History Colorado has cared for the historic treasures of the state for more than 130 years and has directed over a quarter of a billion dollars in grants for statewide preservation and education to all regions of the state. Through the State Historical Fund historic preservation grants program, History Colorado has awarded millions in competitive grants to all 64 counties across Colorado. As the State Historic Preservation Office, the Office of Archaeology and Historic Preservation handles the processing and documenting of statewide archaeological and historic preservation-related projects. Through its various offices, programs, and services, History Colorado exerts a significant economic, cultural and civic impact and continues as a vital entity to the progress and development of Colorado.

The Office of Archaeology and Historic Preservation (OAHP) oversees a number of program areas:

- The Colorado State Register of Historic Properties
- The State Historical Fund. The fund was created in 1990 through a state constitutional amendment allowing limited gaming in the towns of Black Hawk, Central City, and Cripple Creek. A proportion of the tax revenues from gaming is used for historic preservation in Colorado. Applications for projects for potential funding are assessed through a competitive process.

== History ==
The State Historical Society of Colorado was founded in 1879 and currently owns and maintains thirteen historic sites and museums at ten locations around the state. It is both a nonprofit agency and a part of the state department of higher education. The Colorado Historical Society is an affiliate within the Smithsonian Affiliations program and is accredited by the American Alliance of Museums. The central offices of History Colorado are based in Denver.

== Historic sites and museums ==
History Colorado administers the following historic sites and museums:

- History Colorado Center, Denver
- Byers-Evans House Museum, Denver
- El Pueblo History Museum, Pueblo
- Fort Garland Museum and Pike's Stockade, Fort Garland
- Fort Vasquez Museum, Platteville
- Georgetown Loop Historic Mining & Railroad Park, Georgetown
- Grant-Humphreys Mansion, Denver
- Healy House Museum and Dexter Cabin, Leadville
- Trinidad History Museum, Trinidad
- Ute Indian Museum, Montrose

== Centennial Farms and Ranches ==
History Colorado provides designations of centennial farms and centennial ranches that have been in one family for more than 100 years. For example, Salt Works Ranch in Park County.

== State Historian's Council ==
History Colorado has named a historian to "preserve, interpret and share Colorado's past." The State Historian's Council was established in 2018 to provide state-wide support for historical preservation and understanding. The title of State Historian rotates among the members of the council on Colorado Day.

The council includes:

- Dr. Jared Orsi
- Dr. Claire Oberon Garcia
- Dr. Nicki Gonzales
- Dr. Thomas J. Noel (Emeritus)
- Dr. Susan Schulten
- Dr. William Wei (scholar)

== See also ==
- Colorado 1870–2000
- History of Colorado
- List of historical societies in Colorado
