= List of the oldest buildings in Colorado =

This article lists the oldest extant buildings in Colorado, including extant buildings and structures constructed prior to and during the United States rule over Colorado. Only buildings built prior to 1880 are suitable for inclusion on this list, or the building must be the oldest of its type.

In order to qualify for the list, a structure must:

- be a recognizable building (defined as any human-made structure used or intended for supporting or sheltering any use or continuous occupancy);
- incorporate features of building work from the claimed date to at least 1.5 metres (4.9 ft) in height and/or be a listed building.

This consciously excludes ruins of limited height, roads and statues. Bridges may be included if they otherwise fulfill the above criteria. Dates for many of the oldest structures have been arrived at by radiocarbon dating or dendrochronology and should be considered approximate. If the exact year of initial construction is estimated, it will be shown as a range of dates.

== List of oldest buildings ==
See also List of forts in Colorado for additional early buildings, long adandoned.

Building	Image	Location	First built	Use	Notes
Mesa Verde National Park		Cortez, Colorado	900 AD- 1350 AD	Residences	Cliff dwellings
Cliff dwellings at Canyons of the Ancients National Monument		Cortez, Colorado	1300 AD- 1700s AD	Residences	Cliff dwellings
Bent's Old Fort		Ortero County, Colorado	1833	Fort/Trading Post	The original fort was established in 1833 and the present structure was reconstructed in the 1970s on the original foundation. Reconstructed in the 1970s. Still contains the original foundation.
Slocum Cabin		Littleton, Colorado	1852	Residence / Fur trading post	One of the oldest surviving structures in the Denver area. Built along the South Platte River in 1852 and associated with the nineteenth-century fur trade. The cabin was moved from the former Slocum property to Chatfield State Park in 1990.
Capilla de Viejo San Acacio		Viejo San Acacio, Colorado	1856	Church	The oldest church in Colorado and one of the oldest buildings constructed by people of European descent in Colorado.
Fort Garland		Fort Garland, Colorado	1858	Fort	The fort has seven remaining original buildings. Kit Carson was stationed at the fort starting in 1866.
Coulehan-Johnson Cabin		Wheat Ridge, Colorado	1859	Residence	
Doyle Settlement Schoolhouse		Pueblo County, Colorado	1859	School	The oldest one-room schoolhouse in Colorado and the last standing building in Doyle Settlement.
Four Mile House		Denver, Colorado	1859	Residence	Oldest house in Denver, possibly oldest frame house in Colorado.
James H. Baugh House		Wheat Ridge, Colorado	1859	Residence	It is a log cabin encased inside a 1904 frame house.
300 Spring Street		Central City, Colorado	1859	Residence	Part of the Central City/Black Hawk Historic District.
Cornish House		Central City, Colorado	1860	Residence	Part of the Central City/Black Hawk Historic District.
Mount Vernon House		Golden, Colorado	1860	Residence	Also called the Robert W. Steele House.
Raynold's Beehive		Central City, Colorado	1860	Commercial	Part of the Central City/Black Hawk Historic District.
Washington Hall		Central City, Colorado	1860	Government	It served as the first courthouse and jail in Gilpin County. It was also a city hall and fire station. Part of the Central City/Black Hawk Historic District.
120 Spring Street		Central City, Colorado	1860	Commercial	Part of the Central City/Black Hawk Historic District.
200 E 4th Street		Central City, Colorado	1860	Residence	
McFarlane Foundry		Central City, Colorado	1861	Commercial	Part of the Central City/Black Hawk Historic District.
Register-Call Building/Masonic Hall		Central City, Colorado	1861-1862	Commercial	Part of the Central City/Black Hawk Historic District.
Teller Law Office		Central City, Colorado	1862	Commercial	Part of the Central City/Black Hawk Historic District.
Francisco Plaza		La Veta, Colorado	1862	Residence/ Commercial	
Park County Courthouse		Fairplay, Colorado	1862	Government	The first courthouse of Park County and the oldest courthouse in the state. Moved to South Park City Museum in 1978 from Buckskin Joe, Colorado.
Peck House		Empire, Colorado	1862	Residence/ Commercial	
Virginia Dale Stage Station		Virginia Dale, Colorado	1862	Commercial	
414 St. James Street		Central City, Colorado	1862	Residence	Part of the Central City/Black Hawk Historic District.
Barney L. Ford Building		Denver, Colorado	1863	Commercial	Built by Barney Ford, a wealthy businessman and civil rights pioneer who escaped from slavery. The building is the oldest commercial building remaining in Denver.
Kimball-Cozens House		Central City, Colorado	1863	Residence	Part of the Central City/Black Hawk Historic District.
Gallegos-Easterday House		San Luis, Colorado	1863	Residence/ Commercial	
Kimball House		Central City, Colorado	1864	Residence	Part of the Central City/Black Hawk Historic District.
Old City Hall		Central City, Colorado	1864	Government	Part of the Central City/Black Hawk Historic District.
Penrose 2		Central City, Colorado	1864	Residence	Part of the Central City/Black Hawk Historic District.
Pioneer Sod House		Wheat Ridge, Colorado	1864	Residence	
402 Stevens Street		Central City, Colorado	1864	Residence	Part of the Central City/Black Hawk Historic District
St. James Methodist Church	Central City, Colorado	1864-1872	Church	The oldest Protestant church building and congregation in Colorado. The first services were held in the church in 1871.	Part of the Central City/Black Hawk Historic District.
Barnes-Peery House		Golden, Colorado	1865	Residence	Built by David Barnes, the first flour miller in Jefferson County. It is one of the oldest homes in the county as well.
Ladd House		Central City, Colorado	1865	Residence	Part of the Central City/Black Hawk Historic District.
La Morada		San Luis, Colorado	circa 1865	Religious	Former meeting place of the Penitentes.
McClellan House		Georgetown, Colorado	1873	Residence	
Rooney Ranch		Jefferson County, Colorado	1865	Residence	
Roworth Building		Central City, Colorado	1865	Commercial	Part of the Central City/Black Hawk Historic District.
Squires-Tourtellot House		Boulder, Colorado	1865	Residence	The oldest surviving home in Boulder.
Valencia Hotel		San Luis, Colorado	circa 1865	Commercial	
Walker Ranch Log House		Boulder County, Colorado	1865	Residence	The initial house of the Walker family before the construction of the frame ranch house.
Boggs House		Boggsville, Colorado	1866	Residence	The oldest remaining residence that was built in Boggsville by the namesake of the former town Thomas O. Boggs. It is of adobe construction.
Gully Homestead		Aurora, Colorado	1866	Residence	The oldest house in Aurora, Colorado. The original portion of the house is the rear kitchen wing believed to have been built in 1866. The main portion was built in 1870.
Hildebrand Ranch		Jefferson County, Colorado	1866	Residence	
119 Eureka Street		Central City, Colorado	1866	Residence	Part of the Central City/Black Hawk Historic District.
Our Lady of Guadalupe Church and Medina Cemetery		Las Animas County, Colorado	1866-67	Church	
Astor House Hotel		Golden, Colorado	1867	Commercial	
Calvary Episcopal Church		Golden, Colorado	1867	Church	The oldest continuously used Episcopal church in Colorado.
Father Dyer Chapel		Fairplay, Colorado	1867	Residence/ Church	It was purchased and moved by Moved to South Park City Museum in 1981.
Hamill House		Georgetown, Colorado	1867	Residence	One of the oldest houses in Georgetown. It is now a museum.
Lake House		Central City, Colorado	1867	Residence	Part of the Central City/Black Hawk Historic District.
Prowers House		Boggsville, Colorado	1867	Commercial	Built by John Wesley Prowers an early settler and politician of Colorado. It served as a stagecoach station, school, county office, and general store. The house is of adobe construction and the woodwork was shipped from St. Louis.
Scott House		Central City, Colorado	1867	Residence	Part of the Central City/Black Hawk Historic District.
Thomas House		Central City, Colorado	1867	Residence	Part of the Central City/Black Hawk Historic District.
234 E. High Street		Central City, Colorado	1867	Residence	Part of the Central City/Black Hawk Historic District.
Fort Lyon		Bent County, Colorado	1868	Fort	Ten buildings date from the 1867 fort: four Lieutenant's Quarters, two Captain's Quarters, the Commanding Officer's Quarters, the old Army Hospital building, the Commissary Warehouse, and the Quartermaster Warehouse.
Mill City House		Dumont, Colorado	1868	Residence	
128 Casey Street		Central City, Colorado	1868	Residence	Part of the Central City/Black Hawk Historic District.
120 Spring Street		Central City, Colorado	1868	Commercial	Part of the Central City/Black Hawk Historic District.
Baca House and Outbuilding		Trinidad, Colorado	1869	Residence	
Kennicott Cabin		Custer County, Colorado	1869	Residence	Built by Frank Kennicott, one of the earliest settlers in Wet Mountain Valley.
Montoya Ranch		Farisita, Colorado	1869	Residence	
Quaker Flour Mill		Pueblo, Colorado	1869	Commercial	The oldest building in Pueblo that was heavily modified in 1890.

== See also ==
- National Register of Historic Places listings in Colorado
- History of Colorado
- Oldest buildings in the United States
- List of Ancestral Puebloan dwellings in Colorado
