= Ken Caryl, Colorado =

Census-designated place in Jefferson County, CO, USA

- Census-designated place
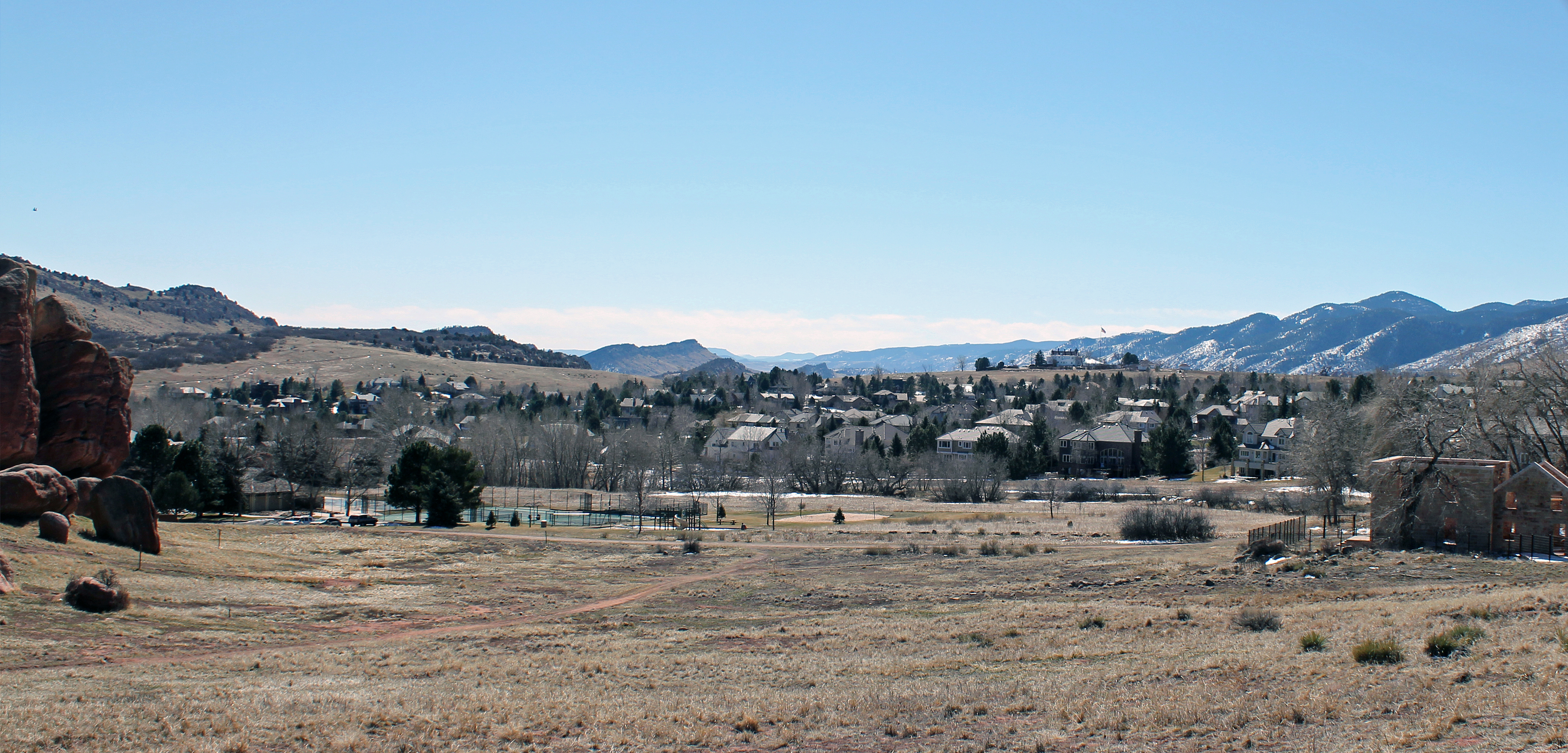
- Ken Caryl in 2014

- Location of the Ken Caryl CDP in Jefferson County, Colorado
- Coordinates: 39°34′36″N 105°07′34″W
- Country: United States
- State: Colorado
- County: Jefferson County

Government
  - Type: unincorporated community

Area
  - Total: 9.863 sq mi (25.546 km^{2})
  - Land: 9.833 sq mi (25.467 km^{2})
  - Water: 0.031 sq mi (0.079 km^{2})
- Elevation: 5,788 ft (1,764 m)

Population (2020)
  - Total: 33,811
  - Density: 3,438.6/sq mi (1,327.6/km^{2})
- Time zone: UTC-7 (MST)
  - Summer (DST): UTC-6 (MDT)
- ZIP Code: Littleton 80127
- Area codes: 303 & 720
- GNIS feature ID: 2408469

Ken Caryl, commonly known as Ken Caryl Ranch, is an unincorporated community and a census-designated place (CDP) located in and governed by Jefferson County, Colorado, United States. The CDP is a part of the Denver–Aurora–Lakewood, CO Metropolitan Statistical Area. The population of the Ken Caryl CDP was 33,811 at the 2020 census. The Ken Caryl Ranch Metropolitan District and the Ken Caryl Ranch Water District provide services. The Littleton post office (Zip code 80127) serves the area.

== History ==
Ken Caryl's history begins with Denver Major Robert B. Bradford's purchase of the property in 1859. He soon built the Bradford/Perley House, as well as a toll road ($1.50 per wagon) to aid travelers moving west from Denver in 1859. The combination of the Bradford/Perley House Inn and the toll road heading towards the mining camps proved fairly lucrative for Bradford. The construction of a competing road up Turkey Creek Canyon in 1867 (known as Highway 285 in the modern day) that replaced Bradford’s more difficult route ultimately doomed his enterprise. After his death in 1876, his widow eventually relinquished the property in 1881. Owners came and went for a period of almost 20 years.

During the ranch's heyday, a number of well-known Colorado natives frequented Ken Caryl, including the notorious Civil War butcher John Chivington. Another regular was Ute chief Colorow. Although Colorow and other Utes in the area were removed after the Meeker Massacre of 1879, he did leave a legacy. Present day Colorow Elementary school was named for him, and a rock formation in the area that was apparently one of his favorite lairs continues to be known as “Colorow's Cave".

In 1895, Ken Caryl was transformed into a stable working farm when James Adam Perley purchased the house. Finding success as a dairy farmer, he and his family lived there comfortably until they sold the property to John Shaffer in 1914. After renaming and giving the ranch its current name after his sons Kent and Carroll, Shaffer soon built the Manor House and diversified into beef ranching. Shaffer, who was also the owner of the Rocky Mountain News at this time, would also purchase the Bradford/Perley House in 1926 to add to his property. Although he ran a profitable ranch for several decades, he was crushed during the Great Depression and eventually forfeited the property to the banks.

The next owner, a businessman named William Allen, subsequently bought the ranch in 1937. Although an executive in the burgeoning steel industry, he also decided to keep and breed cattle on the ranch, which remained profitable until his estate sold it to the Johns-Manville Corporation in 1971. This corporation then shaped the valley into its modern-day form by building a large corporate campus (meant to be their headquarters) as well as a housing community (originally for employees). The headquarter building became the modern Lockheed Martin building when it was sold to Martin Marietta Astronautics Group in 1987, and the plans for the housing community quickly evolved into present-day Ken Caryl Valley’s neighborhoods, whose homes were mostly completed by 1997. The community also was sure to maintain an emphasis on the natural and untouched aspect of the valley, and around 6,000 acres throughout the valley and its neighborhoods have since been dedicated to open space as part of the Jefferson County Open Space.

The Manor House remains restored to original glory and has served food and housed weddings on and off for the past decade or so. It can still be easily accessed and seen in the valley today.

The Bradford/Perley house was ravaged by a fire in 1967, leaving only a frame standing, and was added to the Colorado Preservation Inc. “Most Endangered Sites in Colorado” list in 2002. Fortunately, multiple efforts resulted in it being preserved as ruin in 2006, and subsequently Colorado Preservation Inc. moved the Bradford/Perley House to the “saved” list. It remains a stone frame protected by chain link fencing to this day and can be found easily in the north part of the valley, right next to the Bradford Pool.

Ken Caryl Ranch/Valley also has prominent geologic features, with the oldest rocks, along the bottom of the hillside rising into the foothills west of the Manor House, dating to around 600 million years ago. Following this further west, one can see the biggest mountain in the immediate foothills west of the Manor House, Tincup Mountain (Beacon Hill can also be seen- the shoulder on the south side of Tincup). The hogback (the ridge/rift running along the east side of the valley, opposite of the Foothills, that helps form the valley) is an interesting geologic phenomenon as well, formed from sedimentary layers being pushed upwards around 70 million years ago.

== Geography ==
The Ken Caryl CDP has an area of 6,313 acres (25.546 km^{2}), including 20 acres (0.079 km^{2}) of water.

== Demographics ==
The United States Census Bureau initially defined the Ken Caryl CDP for the 1980 United States census.

Ken Caryl CDP, Colorado
Year	Pop.	±%
1980	10,661	—
1990	24,391	+128.8%
2000	30,887	+26.6%
2010	32,438	+5.0%
2020	33,811	+4.2%
Source: United States Census Bureau

=== 2020 census ===
As of the 2020 census, Ken Caryl had a population of 33,811. The median age was 40.8 years. 21.7% of residents were under the age of 18 and 16.0% of residents were 65 years of age or older. For every 100 females there were 97.0 males, and for every 100 females age 18 and over there were 95.4 males age 18 and over.

99.9% of residents lived in urban areas, while 0.1% lived in rural areas.

There were 13,428 households in Ken Caryl, of which 30.5% had children under the age of 18 living in them. Of all households, 54.6% were married-couple households, 15.6% were households with a male householder and no spouse or partner present, and 23.8% were households with a female householder and no spouse or partner present. About 24.4% of all households were made up of individuals and 9.7% had someone living alone who was 65 years of age or older.

There were 13,772 housing units, of which 2.5% were vacant. The homeowner vacancy rate was 0.8% and the rental vacancy rate was 3.8%.

Racial composition as of the 2020 census
Race	Number	Percent
White	27,997	82.8%
Black or African American	294	0.9%
American Indian and Alaska Native	205	0.6%
Asian	901	2.7%
Native Hawaiian and Other Pacific Islander	32	0.1%
Some other race	923	2.7%
Two or more races	3,459	10.2%
Hispanic or Latino (of any race)	4,010	11.9%

== Business ==
Lockheed Martin and its predecessor, Martin Marietta, operate a facility located in the southern part of Ken Caryl Valley.

== Government ==
The United States Postal Service operates the Columbine Hills Post Office in Ken Caryl CDP.

== Education ==
Ken Caryl is served by the Jefferson County Public Schools. Zoned schools for the CDP include:

- Elementary schools: Bradford K8, Colorow, Coronado, Mortenson, Shaffer, Stony Creek, and Ute Meadows
- Middle schools: Deer Creek, Falcon Bluffs, and Summit Ridge
- Chatfield High School and Dakota Ridge High School

== See also ==
- Front Range Urban Corridor
