= Bear Creek Dam =

Bear Creek Dam may refer to:

- Bear Creek Dam (Alabama), owned by the Tennessee Valley Authority
- Bear Creek Dam, on the Jordan River, British Columbia (Vancouver Island), owned by BC Hydro.
- Bear Creek Dam (Colorado), owned by the United States Army Corps of Engineers, Omaha District
- Bear Creek Dam, Michigan, owned by the Michigan Department of Natural Resources
- Bear Creek Dam (North Carolina), owned by Duke Energy
- Bear Creek Dam, original name of the Francis E. Walter Dam in Pennsylvania
- Bear Creek Dam, Pennsylvania, a component of the Bear Creek Village Historic District
- Bear Creek Dam, Wise County, Virginia, owned by the town of Wise
