= Colorow Point Park =

- U.S. National Register of Historic Places
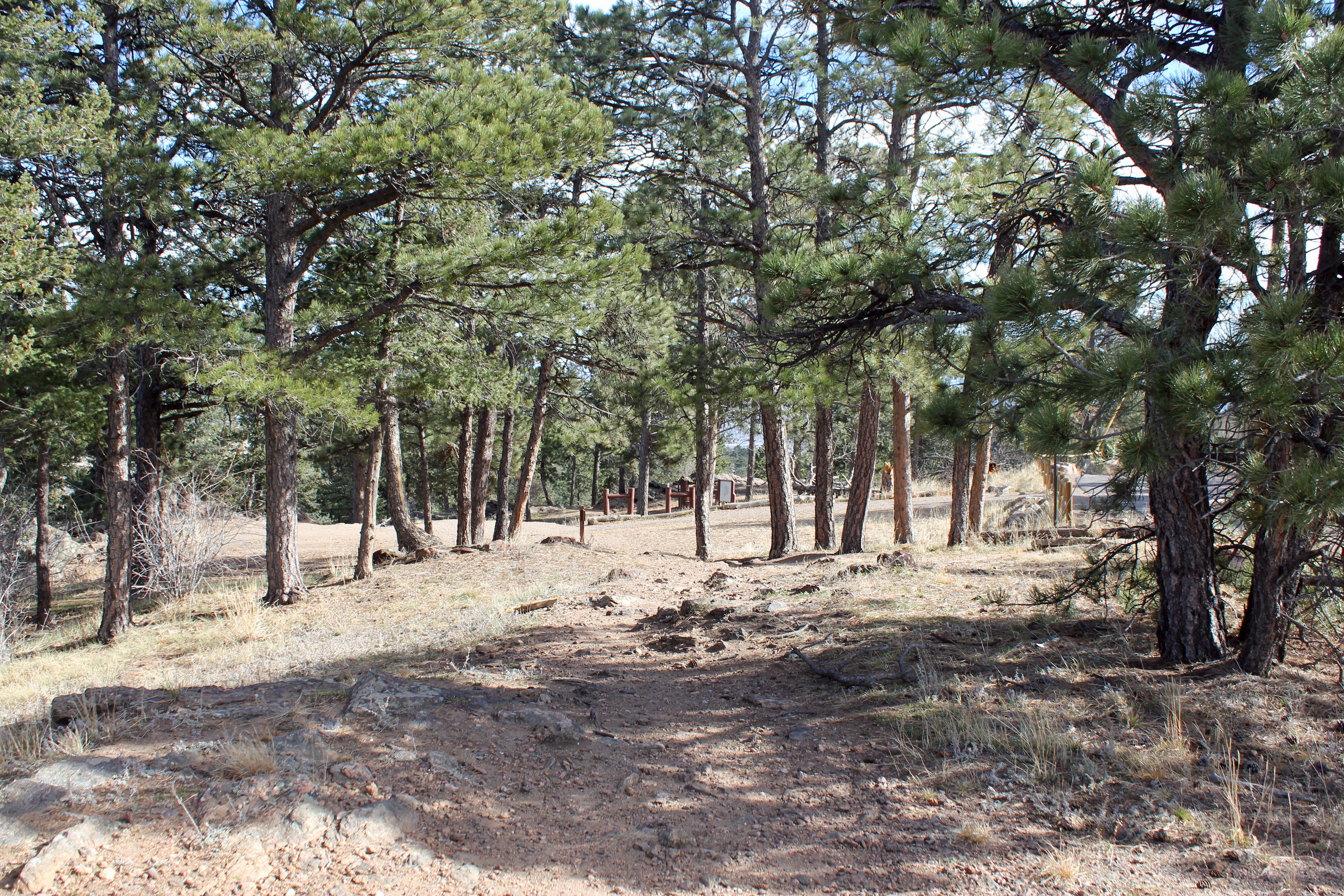

- Location within Colorado
- Location: 900 Colorow Road, Lookout Mountain, Golden, Colorado
- Coordinates: 39°43′47.78″N 105°14′56.85″W
- NRHP reference No.: 90001712
- Added to NRHP: November 15, 1990

Colorow Point Park is a park located on Lookout Mountain in Golden, Colorado. It was placed on the National Register of Historic Places on November 15, 1990. It is named for Colorow, a Ute chief, who used to camp on Lookout Mountain during the summers and held tribal councils at Inspiration Tree at the slope of Dinosaur Ridge. Although it is the smallest park in the Denver Mountain Parks system, at .37 acres, it is notable for its outlook at 7,500 feet in elevation. It provides views of the main peaks of the Rocky Mountain National Park and the Continental Divide, as well as the plains and Clear Creek.
