= Rooney Ranch =

- U.S. National Register of Historic Places
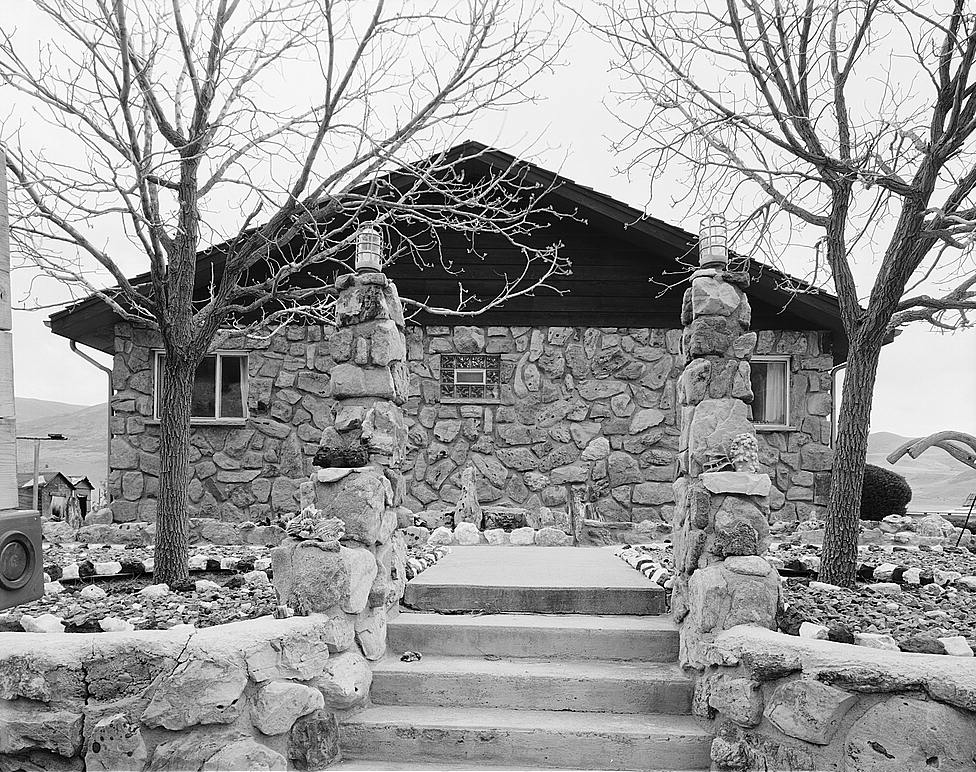
- Location: Rooney Rd. and Alameda Pkwy, Golden, Colorado
- Nearest city: Morrison, Colorado
- Coordinates: 39°41′19″N 105°11′34″W
- Built: 1860s
- Architect: Alexander Rooney
- NRHP reference No.: 75000522
- Added to NRHP: 1975-02-13

Rooney Ranch is an historic ranch near Morrison, unincorporated Jefferson County, Colorado. The ranch is one of Colorado's oldest centennial farms and is the oldest property continuously operated by the same family in Jefferson County.

== History ==
Alexander Rooney came west in 1859 seeking an opportunity. He did a variety of work to earn his keep from stone masonry (Central City, the Masonic Lodge), cartage of lumber and other supplies to the mining camps around Denver and South Park, to a dairy farm. He found the high altitude uncomfortable, so he sought out winter pasture at lower elevations for his cattle. In the fall of 1861 he found what he was looking for along the eastern edge of the Dakota Hogback, between the mountains and the plains. He brought his wife, Emeline, and his family west from Anamosa, Iowa.

While family lore recounts that Alexander Rooney formed an agreement with Colorow to use the land, the family used homesteading to acquire 160 acres (65 hectares) for each qualified member of the family. Subsequent land acquisitions came through the purchase of military patents, state land grant college lands, Union pacific lands, and property from other homesteaders. The ranch ran from the Hogback on the west to the South Platte River on the east, from Bear Creek on the south to Table Mountain near Golden on the north, covering over 4,400 acres (1,800 hectares) at its height.

Alexander Rooney's main earnings were from the cattle and horses he raised. He introduced Galloway cattle from Scotland. Shipped from Scotland to Missouri, he drove them overland to his ranch. The Galloway cattle provided both meat and heavy coats from their hides. He also bred Morgan horses which were sold to the United States Cavalry and the British Army. About two-thirds of the ranch was sold following the Panic of 1893, yet remained the largest ranch in the county at the time.

A coal seam under the property was developed as a coal mine and was worked until August 1932. In 1933, a mine gas explosion destroyed much of the machinery and improvements to the mine, caving the ground in for about 40 feet (12 m) around the mine shaft.

140 acres of the ranch property was sold in 2006, leaving members of the Rooney family holding two parcels of land that include the original ranch house. The company that purchased the property continues the ranching legacy with Black Angus cattle.

== Description ==
The Ranch buildings appear, externally, much as they did in 1865 when they were built. Internally, the buildings have been updated with plumbing and electricity. The buildings are in the valley between a hogback range on the west and Green Mountain on the east. A creek runs the length of Rooney Gulch, and there are a mineral spring, clay pits, lime deposits, and coal deposits nearby. The original buildings were constructed by Alexander. Over the years, additional buildings were added by other family members, who have maintained the masonry skills.

The original ranch house is a two story, vernacular style structure built by Alexander Rooney and Thomas Littlefield circa 1865. The 36 by 24 feet (11.0 by 7.3 m) house is built of coursed sandstone ashlar laid in lime mortar, supported by a limestone foundation. The walls are 18 inches (46 cm) thick. The mortar used to bind the stones was made from lime mined on the ranch, burned in the ranch kilns, and mixed with horsehair and sand from the creek. A spring house, 10 by 12 feet (3.0 by 3.7 m), has the same appearance as the house and was constructed at the same time. It houses a spring which kept dairy products at 51 °F (11 °C).

The current barn was originally built in 1890 on the site of the ranch's original log barn and used timbers from its predecessor in the rear (northeast) elevation. An addition was built in 1936 and sandstone veneer was applied to the first story at that time. An arched rock mosaic sign reading "Rooney Ranch 1860", is found above the entrance.

Additional structures in the historic property listing include Garage No. 1 (1936), Granary (1936), Blacksmith Shop (1940; constructed as a house for ranch hands, named for its location on the site of the ranch's original blacksmith shop), Basement House (1942), Duplex (1946), Garage No. 2 (1946), Grandma Rooney's House (1946), Garage No. 3 (1946), James Vesey House (1950), a spring house (c. 1950), Inspiration Tree Picnic Area (1954), Eileen Rooney House (1955), Garage and Apartment (1955), Alex Rooney House (1959), and a spring house (c. 1980).

== See also ==
- List of the oldest buildings in Colorado
