= Chatfield Reservoir =

Public reservoir in Colorado, US

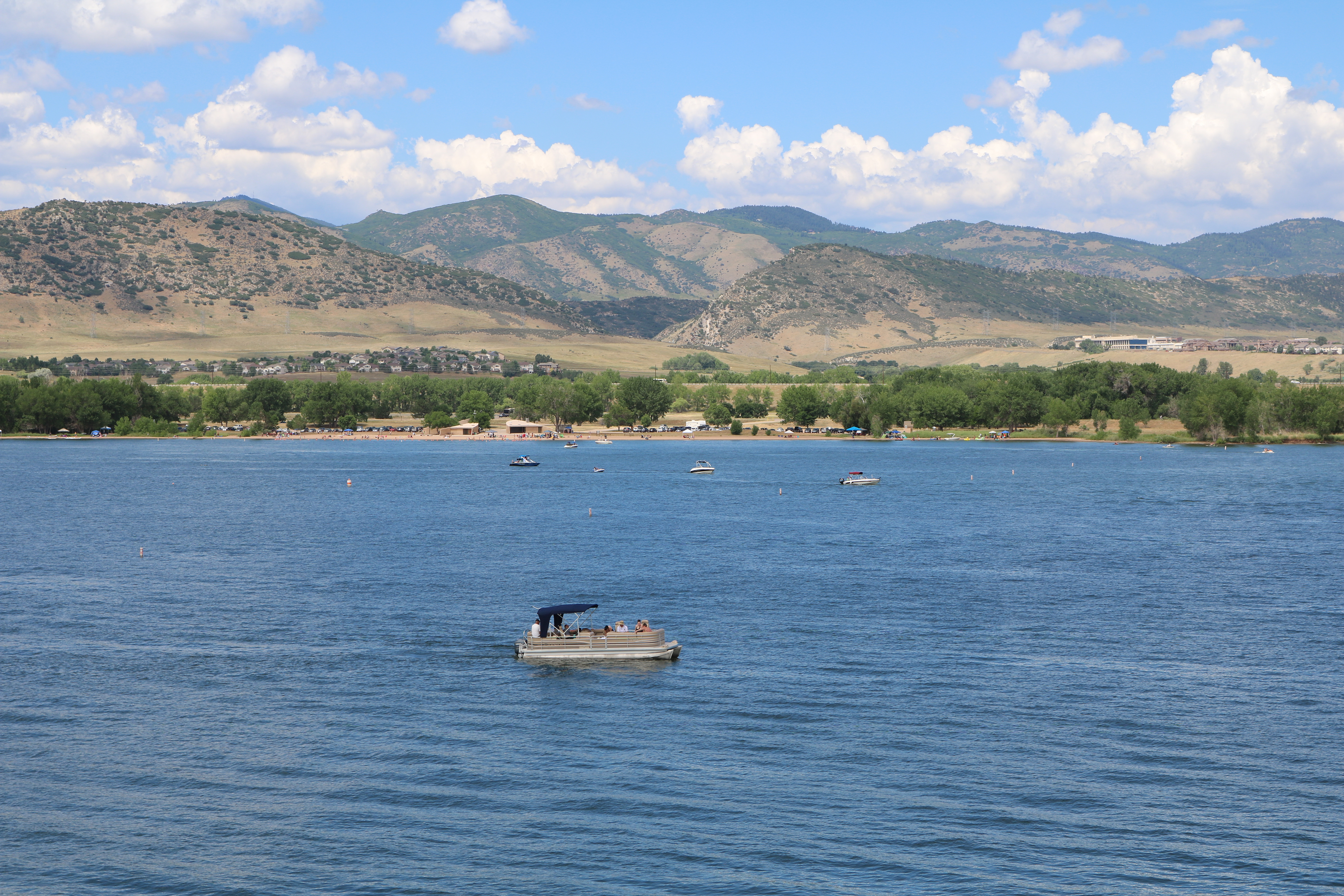
- Chatfield Reservoir

- Location within Colorado Location within the United States
- Location: Douglas and Jefferson counties, Colorado, U.S.
- Coordinates: 39°32′50″N 105°03′54″W
- Type: reservoir
- Primary inflows: South Platte River
- Primary outflows: South Platte River
- Catchment area: 3,018 sq mi (7,820 km^{2})
- Basin countries: United States
- Surface area: 1,500 acres (610 ha) (Normal pool); 4,822 acres (1,951 ha) (Max. Pool)
- Max. depth: 47 m (154 ft)

Chatfield Dam
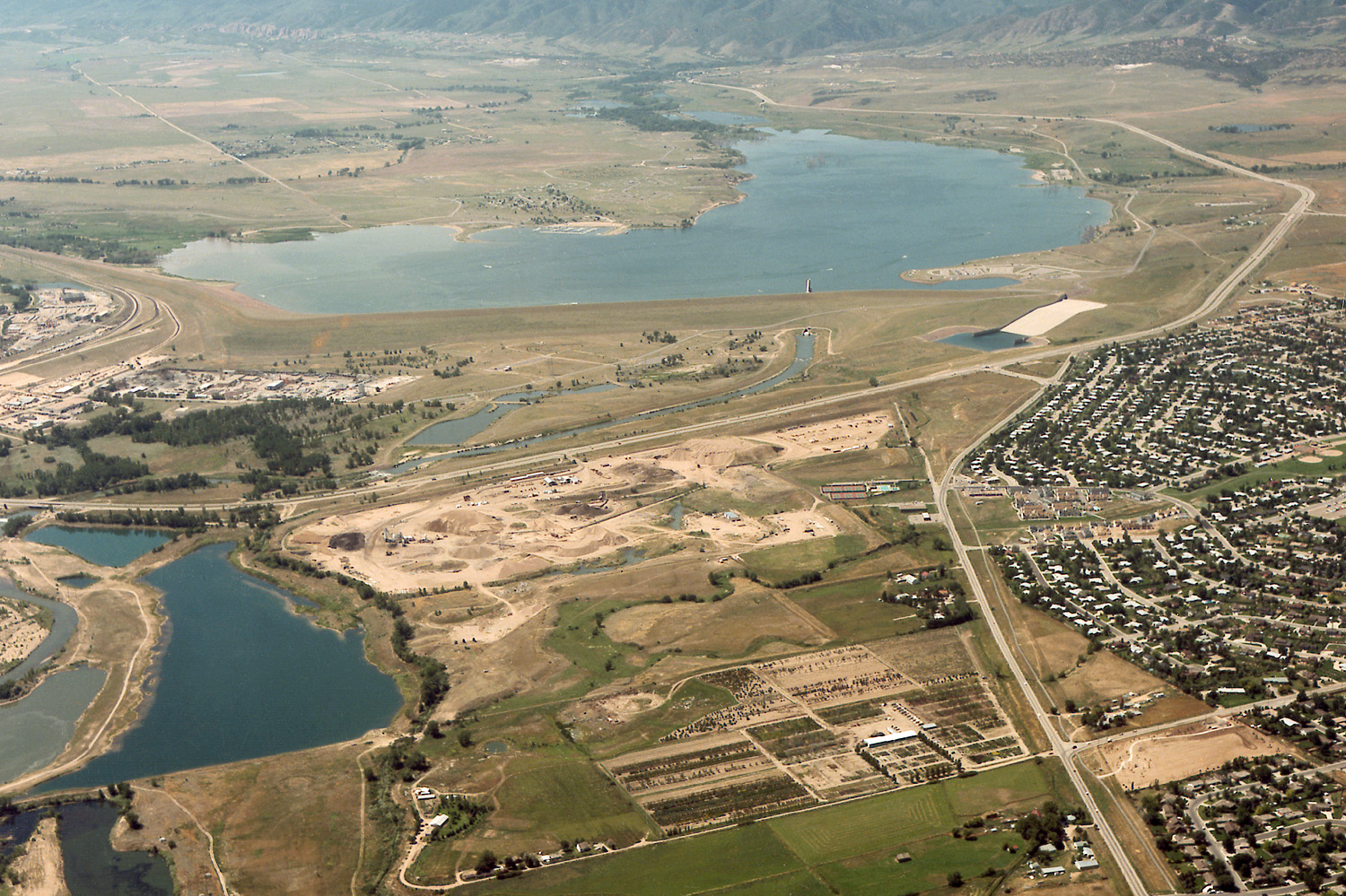
- Chatfield Dam

- Location of Chatfield Dam and Reservoir in Colorado
- Status: Operational
- Construction began: 1967; 59 years ago
- Opening date: 1975; 51 years ago
- Owners: U.S. Army Corps of Engineers, Omaha District

Dam and spillways
- Type of dam: Rolled earth fill
- Height: 147 ft (45 m)
- Length: 13,136 ft (4,004 m)
- Width (crest): 30 ft (9 m)
- Dam volume: 17,255,100 cu yd (13,192,471 m^{3})

Reservoir
- Total capacity: 355,000 acre⋅ft (437,886,052 m^{3})
- Inactive capacity: 27,076 acre⋅ft (33,397,754 m^{3})
- Maximum length: 2 mi (3 km)
- Normal elevation: 5,432 ft (1,656 m) - 5,500 ft (1,676 m) MSL

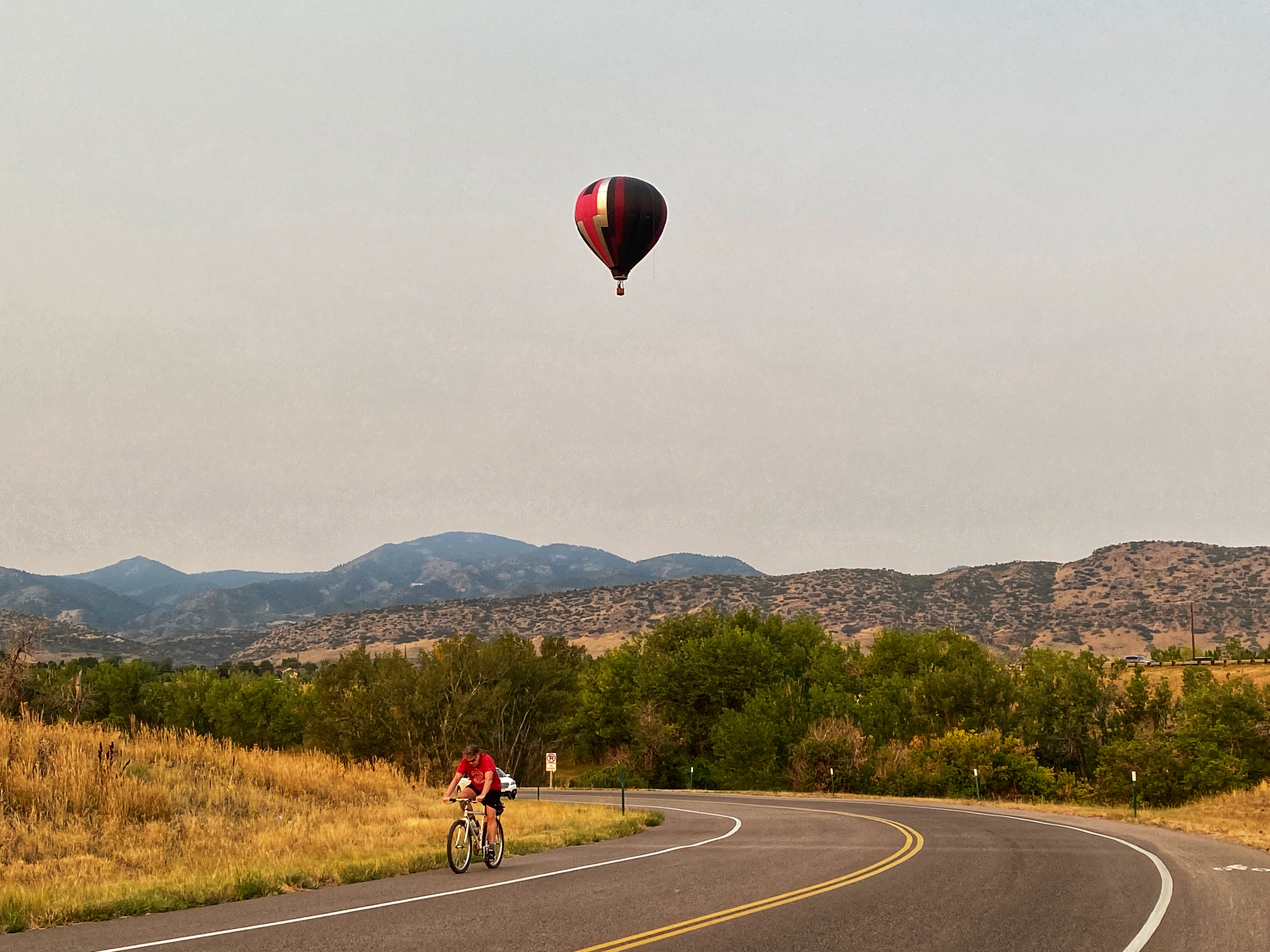
Balloon and cyclist over the Chatfield State Park

Chatfield Dam and Reservoir is a dam and artificial lake located on the South Platte River, south of Littleton, Colorado. The dam and reservoir were built by the United States Army Corps of Engineers as a response to the disastrous flood of 1965. In addition to its primary purpose of flood control, it serves as one of many water supply reservoirs for the city of Denver, Colorado.

== Construction ==
In 1966, the U.S. Atomic Energy Commission projected a total federal cost of $74 million. Construction of the project was begun in 1967 and the dam was completed in 1975.

The massive breastworks of the dam measure approximately 13,136 feet (4,004 m) in length with a maximum height of the dam of 135 feet (41 m) above the streambed. The normal depth of the lake is 59 feet (18 m) at its deepest point. This means the dam towers 88 feet (27 m) above the mean surface of the reservoir.

The lake drains an area of more than 3,000 square miles (8,000 km^{2}). The 1,500 acre (6 km^{2}) lake has a conservation storage capacity of 27,000 acre⋅ft (0.033 km^{3}) with a flood-control pool of over 350,000 acre⋅ft (0.43 km^{3}).

The reservoir inundated the abandoned roadbed of the Colorado and Southern Railway, a historic narrow gauge line active between 1874 and 1942. Until 1899, it was part of the Denver, South Park and Pacific Railroad. The roadbed is still visible extending from the southern shore into the water just west of the inlet.

=== Chatfield Reservoir Reallocation Project ===
The Chatfield Reservoir Reallocation Project, a US$171 million construction project that took place between 2017 and 2020, created an additional 20,600 acre-feet (25,400,000 cubic meters) of water storage in the reservoir, raising its level by about 12 feet (3.7 meters). The project involved moving some of the surrounding park's facilities back from the new, higher lake levels.

Precautions were put into place during the Reallocation Project to adjust the timing and amount of water releases in a good faith manner in order to avoid impacting the walleye and smallmouth bass spawning during the spring. Best management practices were also used to minimize the spread of noxious and invasive weeds during water level fluctuations and soil disturbances due to the new construction.

On May 19, 2023, a new high water mark milestone was achieved as part of the Reallocation Project - reaching 5,444 feet above sea level. This increase in the water level has expanded the overall reservoir footprint resulting in some of the cottonwood trunks to now be below the water's surface and providing more locations for kayaking and paddle boarding.

=== Flood Risk Mitigation ===
During normal operations, the water released from Chatfield Reservoir to downstream users is less than 500 cubic feet of water (cfs) per second. During times of flood risk due to high snow runoff, the outlet structure can release up to 8,400 cfs. The structural design of the spillway was created to pass up to an additional 184,000 cfs in extreme flooding risk.

== Chatfield State Park ==
The reservoir is surrounded by Chatfield State Park, a recreation area with boating, horseback riding, swimming, paddle boarding, fishing, biking, horseback riding, and camping. A secondary inflow from the south is Plum Creek. A tertiary inflow from the west is Deer Creek.

There are 212 bird species that are frequently found at Chatfield Reservoir. These birds either permanently live there or just go there to rest after long migrations. There is a Chatfield bird watch list that anyone can access. The bald eagle, white pelican and burrowing owl have been seen.

== Drownings ==
- On July 5, 2014, 4-year-old Andres Patrick Sena drowned after he went missing for a short period.
- On October 11, 2020, 30-year-old Mireille Audet drowned while paddleboarding.
- On March 30, 2024, 33-year-old Kevin M. Smith drowned while kayaking after he and another kayaker fell into the water. A recovery team found his body overnight.
- On June 2, 2024, 22-year-old Alan Ordonez drowned after being underwater for about 50 minutes.
- On July 7, 2025, 30-year-old James Anthony Hirsh drowned while paddleboarding with his two kids.
- On July 2, 2026, 48-yr-old William “Sonny” Macaluso drowned after jumping into the lake from a boat to help his children after their tube had flipped over. The children were rescued by others, but Sonny did not resurface. His body was recovered the next day. https://www.denverpost.com/2026/07/03/chatfield-reservoir-drowning-death/

== Environmental Issues ==
The Chatfield Reservoir is routinely monitored in three areas: the Reservoir Centroid, the South Platte Arm, and the Plum Creek Arm, which is overseen by the Colorado Department of Public Health and Environment. The water is tested for unhealthy levels of phosphorus, chlorophyll-a, nutrients, constituents of concern, total suspended solids, temperature, and specific conductance that could cause harm to the people and animals that use the body of water.

There have been several irregular test results for E. coli bacteria in recent years that ended up temporarily closing the swim beach at Chatfield State Park. Generally, closures are not a common occurrence, but can be caused by fecal waste from wildlife, run-off from urban areas, or excessive run-off from recent rainfall.

The Colorado Senate Bill SB23-267 was signed by Colorado Governor Jared Polis on June 6, 2023, creating the Chatfield State Park Water Quality Fee. The fee was created to help fund the Chatfield Watershed Plan which identifies opportunities to address chemical, physical and biological pollutants. Pollutants such as runoff from wildfire burn areas, phosphorus outbreaks from degraded upstream banks, and runoff from nearby agricultural land and septic systems.

== See also ==
- Cherry Creek Dam & Reservoir
- Bear Creek & Reservoir
