= La Veta Pass station =

- La Veta Pass Narrow Gauge Railroad Depot
- U.S. National Register of Historic Places
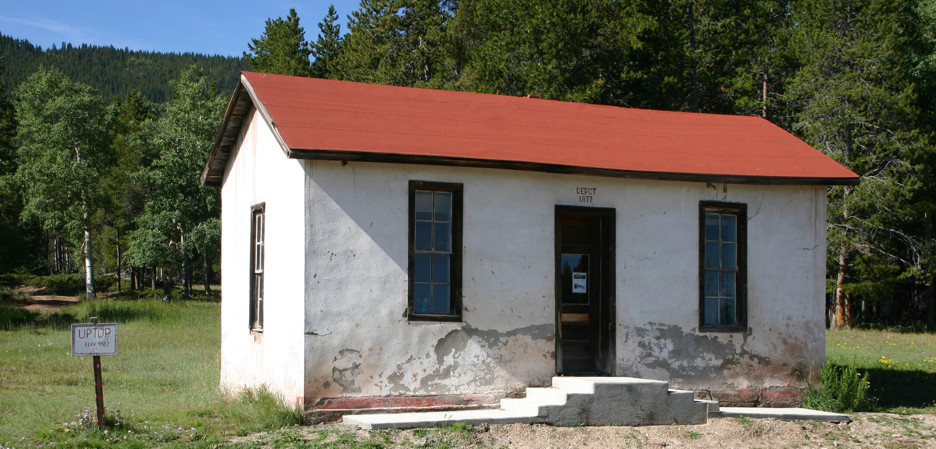

- Location within Colorado
- Location: Off U.S. 160, La Veta, Colorado
- Coordinates: 37°35′35″N 105°12′12″W
- Area: 0.7 acres (0.28 ha)
- Built: 1877
- NRHP reference No.: 80000902
- Added to NRHP: June 6, 1980

The La Veta Pass Narrow Gauge Railroad Depot, in La Veta, Colorado, was built in 1877 for the Denver & Rio Grande. It was listed on the National Register of Historic Places in 1980.

It is near the summit of La Veta Pass, which is at 9,380 feet (2,860 m) elevation.

It is located off U.S. 160.

It is a one-story L-shaped structure. It was used as a passenger depot for about 20 years, until 1899 when the narrow gauge railway was superseded by a standard gauge railway opened about seven miles away.

The remains of an old railway turntable are nearby.
