= Bear Creek Dam (Colorado) =

Bear Creek River, Dam, and Park
- Location within Colorado
- Country: United States
- Location: Lakewood, Colorado
- Coordinates: 39.651757°N 105.140091°W
- Status: Operational
- Opening date: 1982
- Owners: U.S. Army Corps of Engineers, Omaha District

Dam and spillways
- Type of dam: Embankment, earthen
- Impounds: Bear Creek

Reservoir
- Creates: Bear Creek Lake
- Total capacity: 2,000 acre⋅ft (2,466,964 m^{3})
- Catchment area: 236 sq mi (611 km^{2})
- Surface area: 110 acres (45 ha)
- Maximum length: 1 mi (2 km)
- Maximum water depth: 45 ft (14 m)
- Normal elevation: 5,550 feet msl
- Website; U.S. Army Corps of Engineers - Bear Creek Dam

Bear Creek Dam was built on the Bear Creek River, formerly called Grand Encampment as a noteworthy place where multiple Indian tribes gathered, traded, and settled, as reported in an 1816 survey of the area by a French party. The US Army Corps of Engineers built and operates a dam on the confluence of Bear Creek and Turkey Creek within the city limits of Lakewood, Colorado.

The City of Lakewood maintains and operates the 2,600 acre Bear Creek Park in this historic area, which is heavily used by a wide array of neighborhoods and income groups in metro Denver and the mountains. The stream corridors and trails leading up to and surround the reservoirs are home to eagles, owls, and many other creatures, and provide a quiet and natural respite for metro residents. The park and trails are a central component of a larger regional multi-use trail system, a connected destination from the south and north on protected multi-use trails as well as the west through Morrison and east along the Bear Creek Trail corridor. Within the park there are miles of quiet dirt paths along streams as well as paved multiple-use trails to explore on foot, bicycle or horseback, a visitor center featuring displays and naturalist programs, a swim beach and marina with boat rentals, and a 47 site campground with electrical hook ups, as well as a heavily used, partially shaded beach. There are also horseback riding stables offering guided rides, and water ski school and fishing opportunities in the summer months.

== See also ==
- Chatfield Reservoir
- Cherry Creek Dam
- South Platte River
- U.S. Army Corps of Engineers
