= Plum Creek (Colorado) =

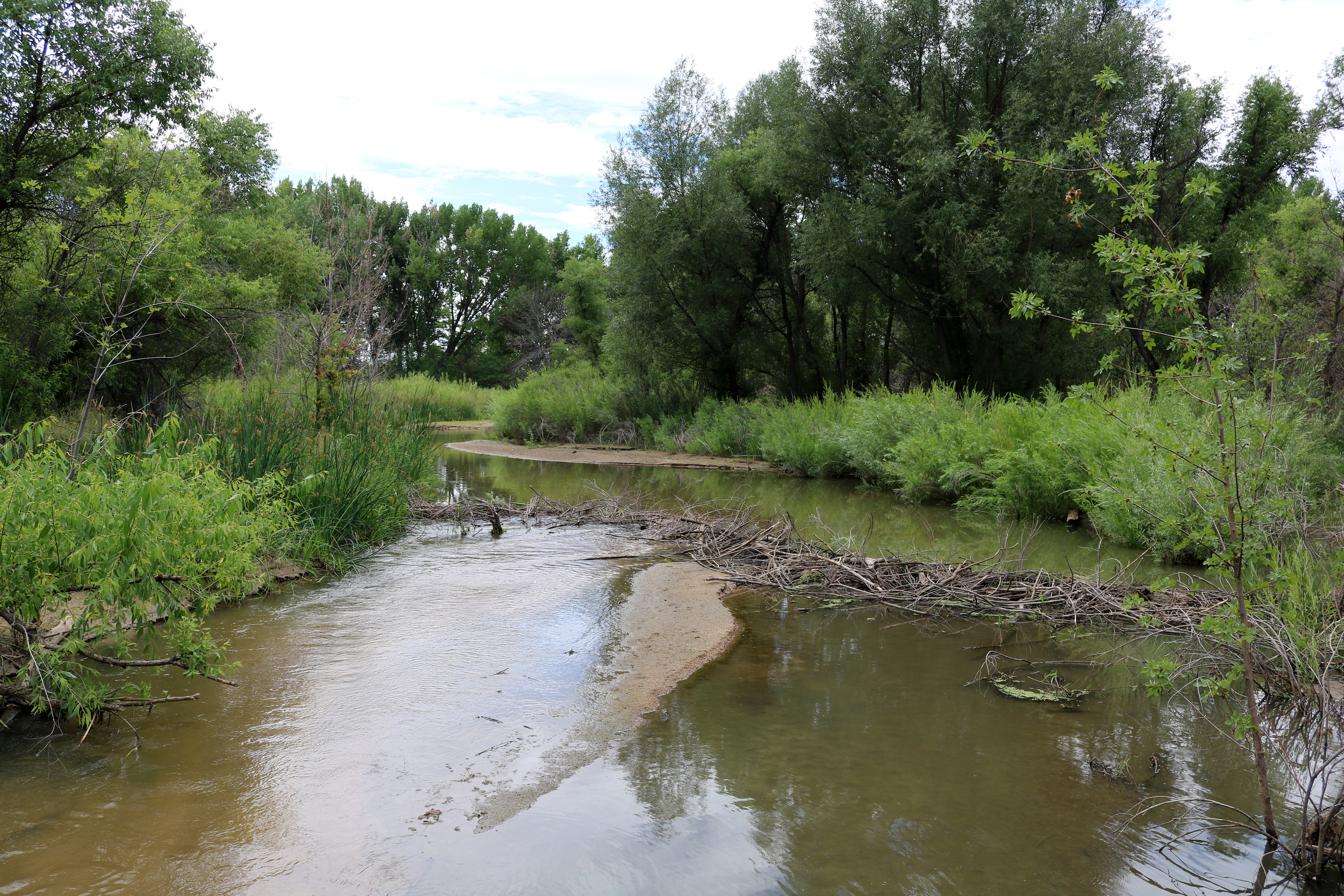
- The creek just before it empties into Chatfield Reservoir

Location
- Country: United States
- State: Colorado
- County: Douglas County

Physical characteristics
- Source: Confluence of West Plum Creek and East Plum Creek
  - location: Sedalia, Colorado
- Mouth: Chatfield Reservoir
  - location: Douglas County, Colorado
  - coordinates: 39°33′23″N 105°3′40″W
  - elevation: 5,430 ft (1,660 m)

Basin features
- Progression: South Platte—Platte—Missouri—Mississippi

Plum Creek is a stream in Douglas County, Colorado, United States. It is formed by the confluence of West Plum Creek and East Plum Creek near the intersection of North Perry Park Road and Manhart Avenue in Sedalia.

Prior to the construction of Chatfield Reservoir in the 1960s and 1970s, Plum Creek merged with the South Platte River in far northern Douglas County. Now, however, it empties into the southern side of the reservoir itself, just west of Santa Fe Drive and within the boundaries of Chatfield State Park.

The Chatfield Storage Reallocation Project, scheduled to start in fall, 2017, will add capacity to Chatfield Reservoir and raise its level about 12 feet. This higher reservoir level will cause the mouth of the creek to move about 7,000 feet further upstream. As part of the expansion project, a mitigation project will also be undertaken to deal with increased sediment deposition and channel erosion along Plum Creek caused by increased urban runoff.

== Sources ==
The two creeks that join to create Plum Creek — West Plum Creek and East Plum Creek — rise in the Rampart Range. West Plum Creek flows northward from the Rampart Range through the West Plum Creek Valley and the sparsely populated, affluent community of Perry Park, west of Dawson Butte. East Plum Creek flows generally northward through Castle Rock and then just south of Castle Pines, Colorado towards its merger with West Plum Creek at Sedalia.

== Influence on local names ==
Together, the three creeks give their names to various roads, businesses and other features in Douglas County. Examples include the Plum Creek Parkway in Castle Rock, the East Plum Creek Trail, and the Plum Creek Golf Club in Castle Rock.

== Catastrophic 1965 flood ==
Plum Creek experienced historically record rain fall and flooding in 1965. Over 14 inches of rain fell in under four hours in a concentrated part of the Plum Creek watershed on 16 June. The creek, the South Platte River, Denver and beyond experienced catastrophic flooding. Peak flows along Plum Creek and its two major tributaries, East and West Plum Creek" exceeded the "estimated 1965 flood peaks with the 100-year (1% annual chance) and 500-year (0.2% annual chance) published flow" by two to four times the 500-year predicted flood rate.

== See also ==
- List of rivers of Colorado
