= Bear Creek (Colorado) =

Bear Creek Lake Park CO
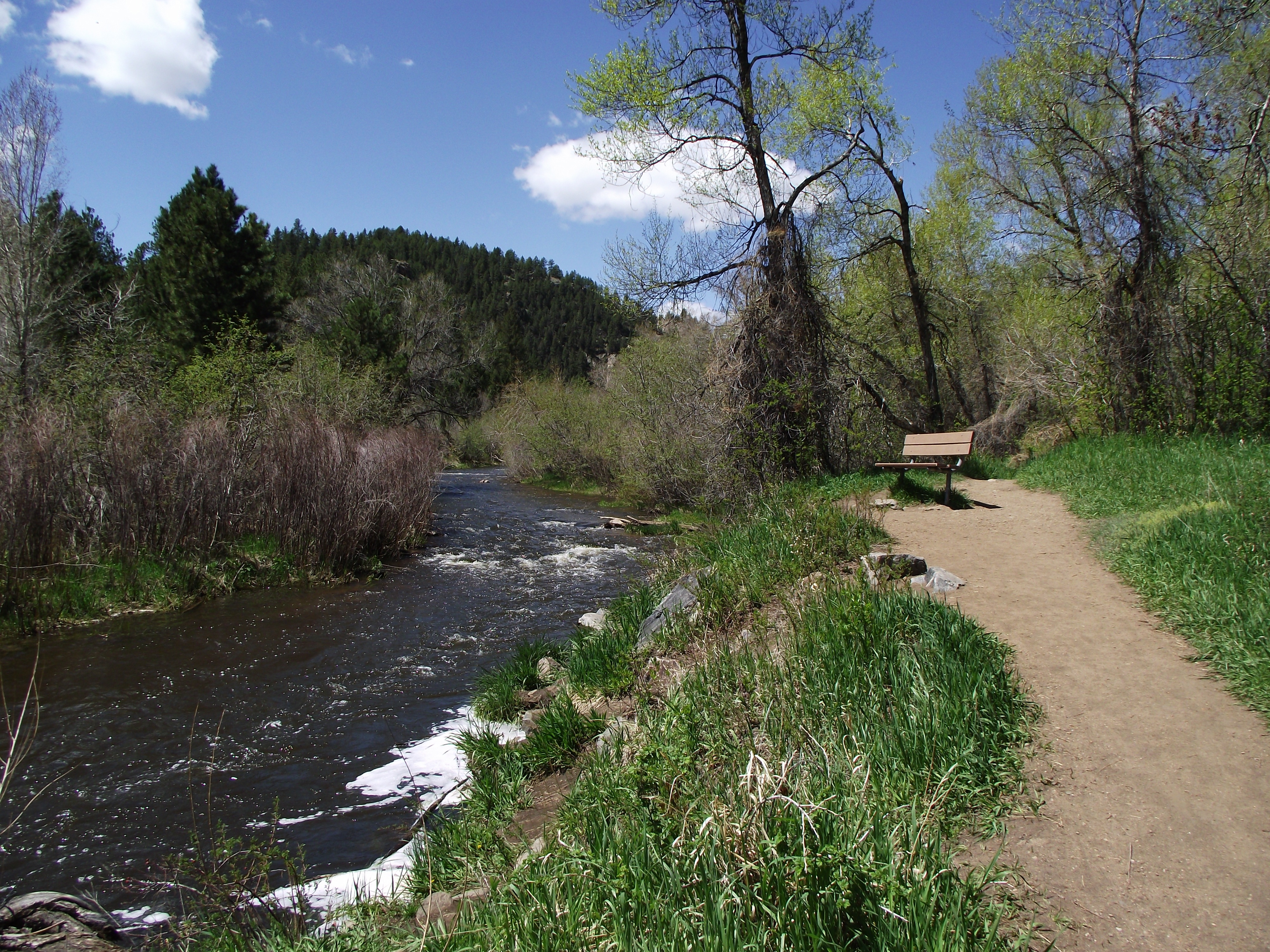
- Bear Creek in Lair o' the Bear park.

Physical characteristics
- Source
  - location: Clear Creek County, Colorado
  - coordinates: 39°35′51″N 105°38′29″W
- Mouth
  - location: Confluence with South Platte
  - coordinates: 39°39′00″N 105°00′49″W
  - elevation: 5,266 ft (1,605 m)
- Basin size: Bear Creek Watershed

Basin features
- Progression: South Platte—Platte; Missouri—Mississippi

Bear Creek is a tributary of the South Platte River in central Colorado in the United States. It begins as a small creek up in the Mount Blue Sky Wilderness in Summit Lake and makes its way through Evergreen, CO, Kittredge, CO, Idledale, CO and Morrison, CO before entering Bear Creek Lake Park, managed by the City of Lakewood, Colorado.

Bear Creek flows to a confluence with the South Platte River in Sheridan, Colorado, just south of Denver, and then into the South Platte River near Englewood. As it moves downstream, Kerr Gulch, Cold Spring Gulch and Saw Mill Gulch all add to its flow making it a sustainable river to fish from spring to fall, with close access to the Denver area and offering many recreational opportunities.

The Bear Creek Watershed totals 236 square miles (610 km^{2}), including all tributaries that discharge into the Bear Creek Reservoir. The two main tributaries are Bear Creek and Turkey Creek. Bear Creek Lake Park is on the plains against the foothills and Hogback (first line of foothills) on the western outskirts of Lakewood and metro Denver, Colorado, adjacent to the town of Morrison. Bear Creek Greenbelt is a greenway running east and west along Bear Creek, bordered on the west by Bear Creek Lake Park and on the east by Wadsworth Boulevard. Bear Creek Lake Park is a 2,624-acre gem (1,062 ha) in a diverse portion of the metro area.

== Earlier Names ==
The original name of Bear Creek comes from the earliest known settlement in Lakewood, which also gave Bear Creek its first name by white explorers: Grand Encampment or Grand Camp Creek. The latter was the name given by Auguste Pierre Chouteau and Jules de Munn, who led a French trading party that came to Colorado Springs and then what is now Bear Creek Lake Park. The party of 47 men found many Indian nations settled together on the banks of the current Bear Creek. The Long expedition report in 1820 also reported that in 1815 a French trading party passing through the area observed a grand encampment on what they called Grand Camp Creek or Grand Encampment. The name Grand Camp Creek or Grand Encampment continued in use until at least that time, 1820. Later in the 1800s Grand Camp Creek was renamed Lupton's Creek and Montana Creek. Its original Indian name is unknown.

== Indigenous Nations ==
People have lived in the Front Range Bear Creek vicinity for around seven thousand years. An archaeological site on Magic Mountain between the City of Golden and Bear Creek revealed Paleo-Indian people in residence 4–5,000 BCE. Other evidence shows "Indigenous hunter-gatherers along the Front Range as early as 12,300 years ago."

Multiple Indigenous Nations lived together where Bear Creek exits the foothills and spills out onto the plains. Francis Cragin, reports that "In 1816, Arapaho, Cherokee, Comanche, Kiowa and Apaches were assembled together in a "grand camp" on Bear Creek, near present-day Morrison, (estab. 1872, listed on National Register of Historic Places in 1976) where Bear Creek opens onto the plains, trading with Frenchmen and evidently all at peace with each other under Chief Bear Tooth." (Colorado Springs Pioneer Museum, Cragin Collection, Box 10, v. 12, "Indians of North America, Intertribal Relations", nd). Multiple tribes living together in one place like this was somewhat unusual and noteworthy, hence the name.

Colorado Encyclopedia notes for the Morrison area that "along the Front Range near what is now Denver was a favored campsite for Native American groups stretching back thousands of years. Evidence from nearby archaeological sites such as LoDaisKa, Magic Mountain, and Ken-Caryl South Valley suggests that the area was used at least as early as 6,000 BCE, and Indians continued to camp, fish, and hunt in the valley until whites displaced them in the nineteenth century." The next entry in the history is 1859.

Utes were also settled in the area and had a long history here. In early summer, they moved from more permanent settlements to ones throughout their territory. Lodges covering the grassy slopes on what is now Lookout Mountain are mentioned, and that "more than 1,000 horses and goats traveled with the band across the land, moving to greener pastures every few weeks. As the grass grazed out, the women and children packed their belongings and headed to the famed Iron Spring in Rooney Valley. The tribes, including Arapahoes, Cherokees, Comanches and Kiowas gathered there peacefully, partaking of the mineral springs and lush pasture near Morrison on the banks of what is now called Bear Creek.

These are the earliest known history and peoples in what is now the Lakewood and Morrison municipal areas, in Jefferson County Colorado. The next historical record in the area is 1839: "Towards evening passed a great number of buffalo – the prairie being actually alive with them — they extended probably about four miles and numbered nearly 200,000. It was a grand sight. Such a scene as this cannot be appreciated by one who has never beheld it. The next day they saw nearly as many buffalo as yesterday." Utes wintered in the Foothills in the area including near Bear Creek. "Native tribes hunted buffalo as their chief food source, following the herds on foot and, after the horse was introduced by the Spanish in the 18th century, on horseback. Their trails followed natural routes into the mountains.""

In 1832 Vasquez Fort was established near Golden. The 1839 report notes a "large encampment or village about 5 miles off," including Arapaho Indians. "22 came out to see us, mostly chiefs. They are rather lighter-colored than our eastern Indians. Two or three women accompanied them. The chiefs seated themselves around the fire, forming a ring with Mr. Vasquez and commenced smoking their long pipes, which they passed around several times. They were all well acquainted with Mr. Vasquez. They remained with him two or three hours. Before they left, we presented them with some tobacco and knives. Among their number was one Cheyenne and one Blackfoot."

In 1840 Little Raven negotiated peace between the Southern Arapaho, Cheyenne, Kiowa, Comanche, and Plains Apache. Little Raven is more associated with the Denver area than with Bear Creek in particular and for interacting with the white settlers who were coming to the area. "Friendly relations, however, deteriorated when many Arapaho refused to sign the Fort Wise Treaty of 1861, which expelled them from their homeland in the Cherry Creek and South Platte valleys. Despite Little Raven's efforts, peace was hard to maintain. The Fort Wise Treaty of 1861 forced the Arapaho away from their homes. Although many Arapaho chiefs did not sign the treaty, Little Raven did sign in hopes of maintaining peace. However, he soon discovered that whites were violating the treaty."

The 1851 Treaty of Fort Laramie encompassed Bear Creek. "In 1851, the Congress of the United States authorized holding a great treaty council with Plains Indians to assure peaceful relations along the Overland Trails. Fort Laramie was chosen as the meeting place and various Indian tribes were invited to come by September 1st. More than 10,000 Plains Indians (men, women and children) gathered to sign the treaty causing the location to move to Horse Creek since Fort Laramie could not accommodate the crowd. The treaty outlined the rights and responsibilities of both the American Indians and the U.S. Government. Never before had so many American Indians assembled to parlay with the white man. This was perhaps history's most dramatic demonstration of the Plains tribes desire to live in peace. Oglala Sioux, Assiniboin, Arapaho, Shoshone (attended though not invited), Brule Sioux, Mandan, Crow, Arikara, Rees, Cheyenne, Gros Ventre, Hidatsa, Snake. The Comanche, Kiowa and Apache refused to attend." A small number of people were involved in the negotiations and approval of the agreement at the Treaty Council. "The Americans demanded the name of the head chief of each tribe who could sign for his people. However, none of the tribes responded with a single name of a leader, so the white men arbitrarily picked chiefs for them," including White Antelope (Cheyenne), Little Owl (Arapaho), Big Robber (Crow) and Conquering Bear (Sioux). Notably the centuries long owners and residents along the banks of what is now Bear Creek, the Apache, Comanche, Kiowa, other Lakota nations, and Utes did not participate or sign.

== First White Settlements ==
As described above, white visitors and settlers began dropping in during the 1800s, calling on the villages and trading along the banks of what is now Bear Creek "Grand Encampment." In 1858 the first white settler town in Jefferson County was recorded as Arapahoe City. According to founding treasurer Thomas L. Golden in a letter to the Missouri Republican it was named after the Arapaho tribe after chiefs warned residents to "quit their country". The 1860 census found 80 people living at "Arapahoe City," including 17 females. An Arapahoe Post Office operated from January 17, 1860, until October 12, 1861. Arapahoe had fifty houses, ranging from tents to log cabins and buildings, but by the end of 1860, Arapahoe City had shrunk to just a few cabins. By 1867, the town was entirely gone. All that remains is a historical marker on the south side of 44th Avenue, 0.2 miles west of McIntyre intersection.

George A. Jackson reported in 1859 that "Indians are thick here...They have sent us word by some of their chiefs to quit their country, but I think we can stand them a rub as we have 700 white men here." In 1860, the town of Golden became the capitol of Jefferson territory. Jefferson County records note an Indian Burial Ground at the northern edge of the City of Golden, near the old cemetery. Another is on what was later the Rooney Ranch, on the north side of Bear Creek. The area's "location along the Front Range made it a gateway to the mountains for indigenous peoples and for Euro-American gold seekers." In the 1860s as more white settlers entered the area, "Jefferson County opened its first school, endured windstorms, floods and a plague of locusts." A decade later the first telephone service was extended to the county.

== First White Settlers in Lakewood ==
A band of Utes considered Iron Springs, at the base of the current Dinosaur Ridge and proximate to Council Tree, as part of their territory. The Utes allowed Alexander Rooney to stay there, and he became known as the first formal settler in the area. This was just north of Bear Creek. Alexander Rooney came from Ohio (Lakewood history) or Iowa (Colorado Encyclopedia) in search of gold. He did some prospecting along the Blue River, then went to New Mexico to work as a miner during the winter of 1860–61. Returning to Colorado in April, he set up a dairy farm near the Swan River. That fall he led his cattle down to Denver to find winter pasture and establish a permanent ranch. He claimed the land, built a log shelter, and went back to Iowa and married Emeline Littlefield. In 1862 he and Emeline returned to Colorado with Emeline's brother, Thomas Littlefield, who would become Rooney's ranching partner." Rooney from Iowa built a ranch house near the Ute's Council Tree and Iron Spring. "Water was flowing out of the groundwater spring," Rooney said, recalling the story, the way he heard it, how his great-granddad came to settle here. "He thought this was an ideal spot. There were buffalo all over." The Ute Indians were the primary people from whom he seemed to need permission.

"A tall Native American named Colorow (originally Comanche but married Ute) and his extended family lived in the Evergreen Valley...on Lookout Mountain, (and)...they would travel down the Apex Trail single-file with their herds of goats and horses, and congregate at what is now the Rooney Ranch along the Hogback. There they bathed in the waters of the Iron Spring. The grass along Rooney Creek and on Green Mountain was plentiful and tall, easily feeding the livestock while the women tanned the hides. The women also designed elaborate patterns on their moccasins using the beads they obtained by trading buckskins."

In the fall of 1861, Alexander Rooney established Rooney Ranch in a grassy valley with good water between Green Mountain and the Hogback, in what is now the Dinosaur Ridge vicinity, down to Rooney Gulch in what is now Bear Creek Lake Park. Rooney Ranch/Iron Springs Ranch was "named for the medicinal springs on the property that Indians continued to use after Alexander Rooney staked claim to the area in 1860. Rooney was attracted to 'the abundance of water and the heavy growth of cedar trees on Green Mountain.' He was a stone mason and in 1860 he built a stone barn that still stands near the stone house he completed in 1865. At one time the family owned 4,480 acres of land as far east as what is now the Federal Center. The first Rooneys to settle this land had extensive contact with the Indian tribes. The late Alex Rooney, fourth generation in the family, once said, "The Americans broke some 232 treaties with the Indian tribes, but my grandfather was respected by them for his honesty; even the hostile Arapahoes became his friends." The most constant visitor was Colorow and his Ute band, who arrived to use the springs and take baths in the blue clay, and also stay for meals. "Al Rooney ultimately was able to obtain a deed for the land through the Homestead Act, under Ulysses Grant (1869-1877) and Benjamin Harrison (1889-1893)."

The agreement for joint use that Rooney had with Colorow and the Utes is unknown but evident from the actions and ongoing joint use by both. At some point, Rooney's and other white settlers' use of the land began to preclude Indians who had resided here for centuries and perhaps millennia, though relationships through 7,000 years back through the early 1800s have not been well-described. Over time, the area's use by white settlers including the Rooney family became more impactful and Indigenous Nations were killed and pushed out. The Rooney family started to mine clay and coal and also raised cattle imported from Scotland and Morgan horses sold to military cavalry units. In the area of the ranch near Bear Creek, Rooney raised hay, alfalfa and corn."

Rooney Gulch and the lands of multiple nations and tribes, called Grand Encampment are part of Bear Creek Lake Park today. Rooney Ranch is the oldest property continuously operated by the same family in Jefferson County. It was also the county's largest cattle ranch ever and one of the oldest stone buildings was constructed on a ledge above Bear Creek, near what is now Bandimere Speedway. Al Rooney became an important member of the Colorado cattle industry until the Panic of 1893 and the economic depression that followed led the Rooneys to sell about two-thirds of their ranch. With 1,380 acres remaining, the family still claimed the largest ranch in the county and continued to raise cattle but also further diversified; farming, cattle raising, and coal mining continued into the twentieth century.

"The County prospered by providing transportation, food, timber, coal, bricks, and supplies to Denver and to mining districts in Gilpin and Clear Creek counties. Abundant natural resources contributed to this early growth--fertile farmland, vast timber stands (all cut on Green Mountain), and deposits of stone, clay, and coal supported early industries." Al Rooney started leasing land to various mining companies after coal was discovered on the ranch in 1872. At the time, the family owned land east of Green Mountain to the flatter land that is now the Federal Center. South of what is now West Alameda Parkway on the slope of Green Mountain, the Satanic Mine opened in 1872. During World War I the Satanic Mine employed 77 men, shipping seven carloads of coal daily. On Dec 15, 1921 the mine caught fire and the deadly gas fumes 200 feet below ground killed six men. Fire department personnel from as far as Denver and Leyden arrived to blast their way in and retrieve the bodies. After this accident, the mine was renamed the Blue Bird. A four-story house where miners had lived was torn down when the Works Progress Administration (WPA) build West Alameda to Red Rocks Amphitheater and Park.

Near Bear Creek behind the Hogback (first line of foothills at the edge of the plains) were seven quarries of "white sandstone, red sandstone, and blue sandstone...of the finest quality, and, in addition, the two remaining quarries produced gypsum and limestone," wrote the Denver Daily Times in 1881. Twenty years later, when the Colorado Transcript wrote that Morrison was "the second town of importance in Jefferson County...tourism...the spectacular Red Rocks nearby — was ascending in value to the local economy. The Soda Lakes (of Bear Creek Lake Park) near Morrison, today a recreational resource, are a remnant of a once significant industry." Gravel continued to be extracted from the hard rock of the mountain front as well as from the alluvial deposits of the lower elevations. As of 2013, Robinson Brick Co. still produced brick clay at the Chieftain Mine in Rooney Valley. Agriculture continued until the mid-20th century. Agriculture by Indigenous people's has been less acknowledged, until recently and called "gathering".

Jefferson County Open Space acquired parcels of Rooney Ranch land on or near Dinosaur Ridge to protect them from development. Bear Creek Lake Park, owned by the Corps of Engineers and leased to the City of Lakewood protects Rooney Gulch and the Indigenous village and settlement sites of many Indigenous Nations referenced at Bear Creek/Grand Encampment Creek. Historical markers are not present at this time. Many trails wind through the area which is one of the few natural riparian areas left in the region.

== Historical Surveying ==
In 1975 the (remaining?) Rooney Ranch was listed on the National Register of Historic Places. In 1976 it became a Jefferson County Landmark, and in 1987 it was named a Colorado Centennial Ranch. In 2010 the ranch's founders, Alexander and Emeline Rooney, were inducted into the Jefferson County Historical Commission Hall of Fame.

Historical surveying in Jefferson County has been mainly focused on inventories of structures built by white settlers, though the study introduces itself as "intended to lay a foundation for a proactive program to preserve the last physical links to the county's past" and that "Future phases will build upon this foundation. The Historic Contexts Report describes influences on the county's origins, early settlement," organized by themes, for application "when evaluating the historic significance of buildings, structures, sites, and districts." Value was placed on architectural intactness and possession of potential for historic and architectural significance. This "and" is important; "this property list is used to notify Jefferson County Planning and Zoning Staff when proposed land uses will impact historic properties," architecturally intact white settler buildings and structures, largely precluding other places eligible for inclusion in the National Register of Historic Places (NRHP) "based on its associations with the cultural practices, traditions, beliefs, lifestyles, arts, crafts, or social institutions of a living community." Traditional cultural properties were introduced in the "National Register Bulletin 38, published in 1990, as a label for places that living groups of people value as reflecting their — the people's —traditional identities. These places, and hence the people, were getting short shrift in federal agency planning and environmental impact assessment because they weren't routinely recognized as eligible for the Register, and therefore were not being considered under Section 106 of the National Historic Preservation Act (NHPA)." Non-architectural places still often get short shrift in such planning, an especially acute problem in urban and suburban areas. Structures are what are prioritized for survey work. Still, "the natural landscape is inherently connected to Jefferson County's identity and its role as the gateway to the mountains" for Native Americans, settlers, and people of today." Two new openings to the mountains were carved, to add to Bear Creek's and Clear Creek's, in the 20th century.

King, one of the eminent people in the field who coined the term "traditional cultural properties" described the evolution of assessment and listing on the National Register of Historic Places "based on well-developed professional standards. The effect of this excuse was to hold Register eligibility hostage to evaluation by architectural historians, historians, archaeologists, and a few others holding semi-advanced academic degrees. If a place wasn't something (such) a "professional" could appreciate, it wasn't eligible." The "simple purpose in writing the thing (National Historic Register Bulletin 38 on Traditional Cultural Properties was) to get the federal government to attend as carefully to the cultural values of ordinary people as it did to the interests of historians, architects, and archaeologists. This was not a new idea. As the quote that begins this piece suggests, the interests of ordinary citizens in their history and culture were very much on the minds of those who thought up the National Historic Preservation Act in the middle of the last century. And it must be assumed that such interests motivated Congress, too. Old buildings and archaeological sites do not vote, and the percentage of the electorate represented by historians, architects, and archaeologists is hardly sufficient to justify legislation as sweeping as NHPA. But addressing the cultural interests of mere citizens has generated a good deal of fretfulness on the part of preservation practitioners. Such interests are not always easily expressed in terms to which archaeologists and architectural historians naturally relate. Cultural significance is not easily measured, or even observed; it exists in people's heads, and learning about it usually requires talking with them, sometimes in ways with which outsiders are not entirely conversant or comfortable. Indeed it may not even be possible to talk about such significance; it may simply have to be felt by those who are able, and taken on faith by everyone else."

== Recreation and Wildlife ==
In 1864 George Morrison acquired 320 acres near Bear Creek behind the Hogback upstream of the Grand Encampment/villages settled by Plains Indians (including the Arapaho, Apache, Cherokee, Cheyenne, Comanche, Kiowa) on the banks of Bear Creek (current Bear Creek Lake Park). In 1872 Morrison and a group of investors, including former Colorado Territorial governor John Evans and railroad developer David Moffat, incorporated the Morrison Stone, Lime and Town Company.

Like many of the country's founding fathers, Evans, Morrison, and Moffat were land speculators and developers; "Evans's real estate and railroad interests made him wealthy...(joining) the Republican Party in the mid-1850s...in 1860, Evans and his friends made no secret of his desire to be named governor of some plum western territory." Morrison, Evans and Moffat's plan was to establish a town along Bear Creek on land that Morrison sold to the company. The town would have Morrison's quarries as an industrial base and would also be developed for tourism to take advantage of its picturesque location. Evans and Moffat also planned to route their narrow-gauge Denver, South Park & Pacific Railroad through Morrison. In 1874 the Denver, South Park & Pacific Railroad arrived to haul out construction materials and bring in tourists. Morrison ended up being on a spur line rather than the main line after engineers decided that the railroad should go up Platte Canyon instead of Bear Creek Canyon. In 1874 Morrison also completed a high-class sandstone hotel that Evans hired him to build, with 42 rooms and dancing pavilion, on high ground south of Bear Creek, with great views of Mt. Morrison and the area's large red rock formations to the north. Tourists could pay sixty cents round-trip for an express train that took about forty-five minutes from Denver. In 1906 John Brisben Walker traded the Catholic church, which had taken over the hotel for a Jesuit college, for an alfalfa field he owned closer to Denver, which became Regis College. Subsequently, Walker built a pavilion for concerts at Red Rocks, used by the Ute tribe in earlier times. In 1908 he opened an incline railway from Red Rocks to the summit of Mt. Morrison. Tourists could take the train from Denver to Morrison and rent a burro or buggy to get to Red Rocks, where they could enjoy an afternoon concert or pay seventy-five cents to ride the incline railway up Mt. Morrison. Increasing highways and automobile travel undercut this as roads like the Lariat Loop (which came through Morrison) were completed and automobile tourism became more popular. Walker first tried to sell Red Rocks to the city of Denver in 1924, and the City eventually did acquire Red Rocks in 1929. "During the Great Depression, George Cranmer, Manager of Improvement and Parks in Denver, utilized the Civilian Conservation Corp in the construction of a large outdoor amphitheater that is in harmony with the surrounding natural landscape. The amphitheater was completed in 1941, and the camp that housed the men who built it remains intact within the district." The Civilian Conservation Corps guaranteed public jobs program from 1933 to 1942 in the United States for unemployed men in their teens and 20s (3 million took part on projects on lands owned by federal, state, and local governments), to relieve families who had difficulty finding jobs during the Great Depression in the United States. The program provided them with shelter, clothing, and food, together with a wage (equivalent to $1,000 in 2021) per month ($65 of which had to be sent home to their families). The famed Red Rocks concert venue was dedicated in 1941. In 2015 Red Rocks Amphitheater and the Mount Morrison Civilian Conservation Corps camp were named a National Historic Landmark. Visitors also come to the Morrison Natural History Museum and nearby Dinosaur Ridge to learn about the many important dinosaur fossils and footprints that have been discovered in the area since the late 1870s.

"Bear Creek Lake Regional Park is a serious hot spot for Denver locals in part because it is a short 20-minute drive from the heart of the city. It is a small and very calm lake, making it super kid friendly. The shady riparian area and lake shore make it unique compared to other Corps reservoirs in metro Denver. It receives usage by highly diverse populations, as other Corps reservoirs are located in the metro area's whiter and richer suburbs to the south, such as Cherry Creek Reservoir in Greenwood Village and Chatfield Reservoirc, south of Columbine in Douglas County. The park has been leased by the City of Lakewood for public access.

Lakewood's Community Resources, Natural Areas Plan describes many riparian and riparian-adjacent areas as "Sensitive zones- This designation will be used for areas that provide high quality wildlife habitat and could be particularly sensitive to human impacts. This will include many wetland and riparian areas and any areas that are determined to be of significant value for breeding or nesting (deer fawning areas, coyote den sites, etc.). Management in sensitive zones will be focused on restoration and protection of native vegetation and wildlife, and human use and recreation will be more limited than other zones. Trails and other recreational development will be limited in these zones, and human use may be restricted. This may include small closure areas, or requirements to remain on designated trails only," though Bear Creek Lake Regional Park makes such places accessible to people. The park at large is a Natural Zone with many shady trails; "Natural zones will be relatively large areas with little site disturbance, where ecological processes are to a large extent unimpaired. These areas will be managed for passive recreation, focusing on trail use, wildlife observation, and providing a sense of solitude. The focus of management in these areas will be on restoration and protection of native vegetation and wildlife. These areas will typically not be developed for more active uses." The park also includes owl, eagle, and hawk nesting sites and also functions as a wildlife corridor "strips of undeveloped land that provide a connection from one large park or open space to another. Wildlife uses corridors for food, cover, habitat and movement. Corridors can also consist of trails, waterways, parks...and greenbelts intended for human use. The Bear Creek Greenbelt is a great example of a corridor within Lakewood. It provides all the needs that wildlife may have as well as many recreational opportunities for residents. Maintaining healthy corridors is vital for multiple reasons. Healthy corridors can prevent some wildlife conflicts by limiting wildlife interests in moving into residential areas, and providing larger expanses for wildlife to disperse within. They can also provide for exceptional wildlife viewing and recreation," referencing the cover provided for animals in the riparian corridor as particularly important. In a semi-arid environment such as Colorado's riparian ecosystems along the banks of rivers, streams and other bodies of water are rich and rare resources on the Eastern Plains and Front Range, especially when shaded. "These areas are dominated by deciduous trees and have a wide diversity of plant and wildlife species. Many of Lakewood's riparian areas evolved over hundreds of years without the impacts of man."

Wetlands are uncommon as well, though "common in Bear Creek Lake Park and the Greenbelt...Wetlands are home to the largest variety of plants because of the wet soils. These areas create very significant wildlife habitat and provide important water quality functions. For these reasons they need to be protected from recreational use, development, erosion, and other negative impacts to the greatest extent possible. These areas will receive special consideration during any project or trail planning, and ongoing efforts will be made to protect and restore and improve the existing wetlands within the parks. Wetland areas may also be designated as sensitive zones," says Lakewood's plan. "Habitat maps will include rangeland, riparian areas, wetlands and corridors," such as Bear Creek Lake Park. "Bear Creek Lake Park and the Bear Creek Greenbelt are the two proposed sites for the City's beaver management plan. These two sites both contain beaver populations at the present time and have habitat for more beaver...Colony sizes range from two to twelve animals and are made up of two adults, three to five kits, and three to five yearlings. When water levels rise because of the pond, the water leaches out into the ground raising the water table. This provides valuable water to support vegetation growth around the pond. Vegetation can grow on the outskirts of the riparian area creating a buffer zone between different habitats and the pond. This is a catalyst for wildlife and plant species diversification. Thus, beaver provide a rich habitat in riparian areas."

Primarily a Brown Trout fishery for most of its waters, Bear Creek also holds a population of intermixed rainbows and toward the Mount Blue Sky Wilderness, tributaries and main channels hold some brook trout 12 inches and smaller.

- List of rivers of Colorado
