= Francisco Plaza =

- U.S. National Register of Historic Places
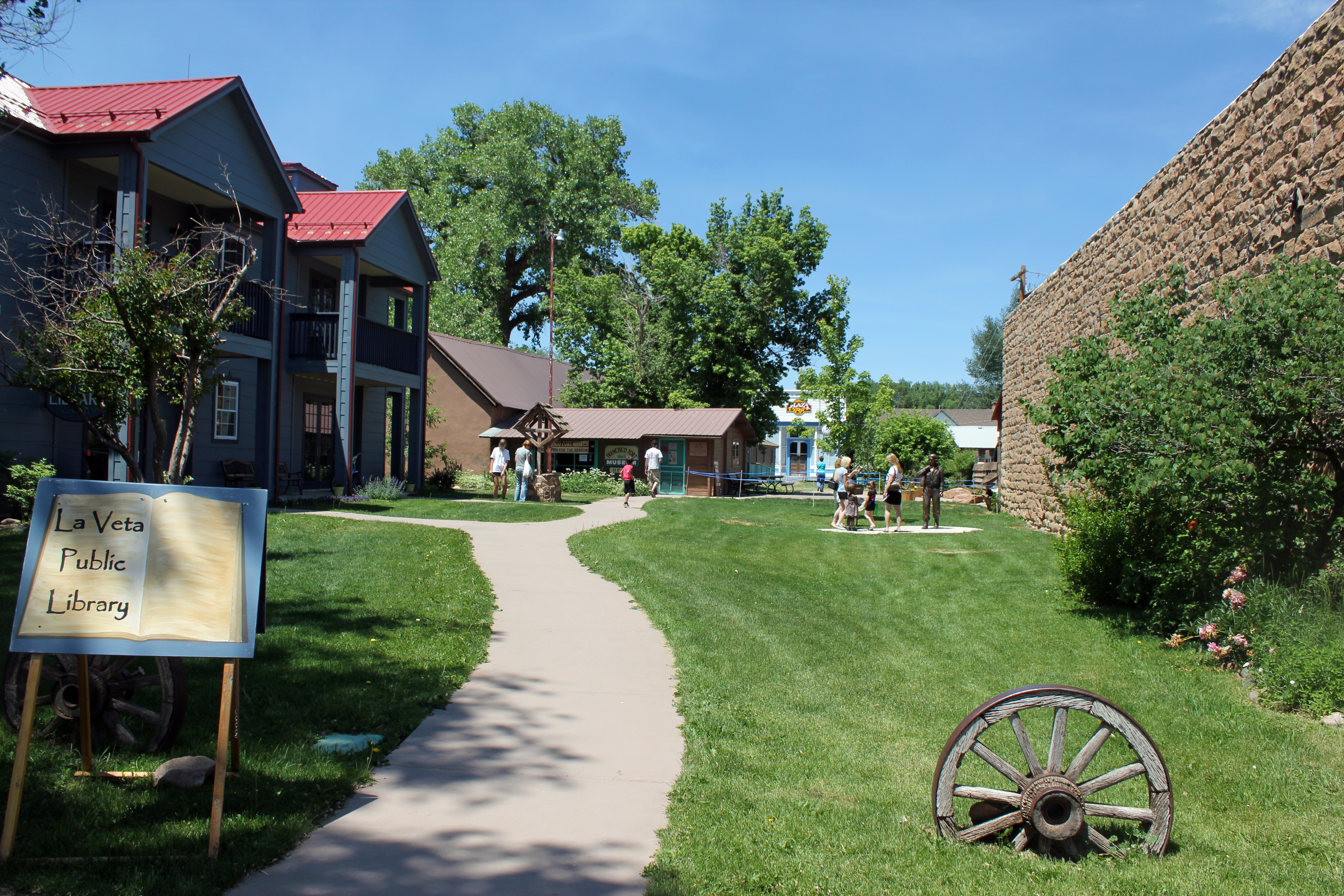
- The museum in 2012

- Location within Colorado Location within the United States
- Location: 312 S. Main St., La Veta, Colorado
- Coordinates: 37°30′27.7″N 105°0′35.1″W
- Area: less than one acre
- Built: 1862
- Architectural style: Territorial style
- Website: https://www.franciscofort.org/
- NRHP reference No.: 86002950
- Added to NRHP: October 23, 1986

Francisco Plaza, also known as Francisco Fort Museum, built in 1862, was the first significant dwelling in the Cuchara Valley at what became La Veta, Colorado. The plaza is now a part of the museum complex. Only the courtyard and the fort building were added to the National Historic Register in 1986. The other structures are new, or were moved to this location during the 1960s.

== History ==
The plaza was originally a U-shaped structure, much modified over the years. It was built by John M. Francisco of Georgia, and his business partner, Henry Daigre, a Frenchman from Quebec, and served as the headquarters for their cattle ranch. The ranch sold beef to the U.S. military forts in the area. The area around the plaza was home to Hispanic workers for the ranch. The plaza served as a supply center to the growing community, occasionally proving protection from Ute Indian attacks.

The plaza served as a temporary depot for the Denver and Rio Grande Railroad when it arrived in 1876. The town of La Veta, incorporated at the same time, never grew to more than 800 residents. The plaza became a residence and farm again for John M. Francisco by the 1890s, the partnership with Daigre having ended possibly 20 years prior. Francisco owned the plaza until his death in 1902. It then passed through various family members, and was acquired by the Huerfano County Historical Society in 1958.

One notable attraction now housed at Francisco Fort is the original bar from notorious outlaw Robert Ford (outlaw), who killed Jessie James.

== Architecture ==
The remaining historic structures were adobe of typical early Hispanic style, built of 18 to 24 inch thick adobe bricks. The building had three sides, each 100 feet long, with the fourth side closed by a fence. Significant changes were made to portions of the building, other buildings were built and rebuilt. The buildings were renovated in the late 1990s.
