= La Veta, Colorado =

Town in Colorado, United States

Town of La Veta, Colorado
- Statutory Town
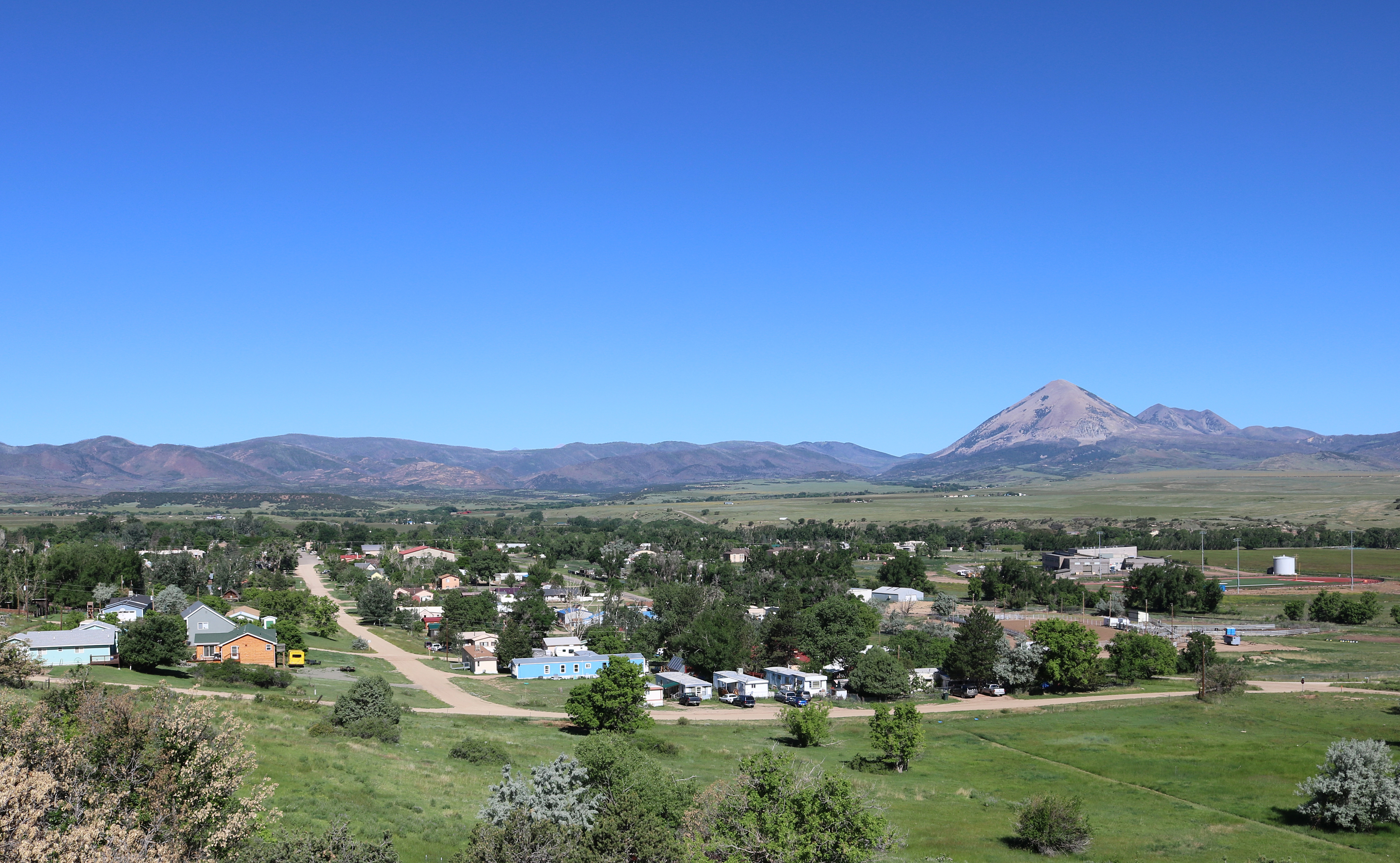
- La Veta from the east, looking towards Mount Mestas

- Location of La Veta in Huerfano County, Colorado.
- Coordinates: 37°30′25″N 105°00′29″W
- Country: United States
- State: Colorado
- County: Huerfano
- Incorporated (town): June 16, 1886

Government
  - Type: Statutory Town
  - Mayor: Douglas R. Brgoch

Area
  - Total: 1.37 sq mi (3.54 km^{2})
  - Land: 1.37 sq mi (3.54 km^{2})
  - Water: 0 sq mi (0.00 km^{2})
- Elevation: 7,021 ft (2,140 m)

Population (2020)
  - Total: 862
  - Density: 631/sq mi (244/km^{2})
- Demonym: La Vetan
- Time zone: UTC-7 (Mountain (MST))
  - Summer (DST): UTC-6 (MDT)
- ZIP code: 81055
- Area code: 719
- FIPS code: 08-44100
- GNIS feature ID: 2412857
- Website: townoflaveta-co.gov

La Veta (/ləˈvitə/ lə-VEE-tə, Spanish for "the vein") is a statutory town in Huerfano County, Colorado, United States. La Veta sits at the base of the Spanish Peaks on the Highway of Legends National Scenic Byway. The town population was 862 as of the 2020 United States census.

== History ==
Col. John M. Francisco, the sutler at Fort Garland, and his business partner, Henry Daigre, purchased 48,000 acres of land in Cuchara Valley in 1862. The land was part of the Vigil land grant. They established a settlement for farmers and ranchers, with Francisco Fort as the commercial center. The 100-foot-square building was constructed with 2-foot thick adobe walls, interior rooms, that opened up to a central plaza. It was built with a flat roof with gun ports along the parapets. In 1863, the fort was attacked by a band of Ute Indians. Men got on the roof to defend the fort, and a volunteer rode to Fort Lyon. The Utes departed before the troops arrived.

In 1871, the settlement was named Spanish Peak and a post office was established. New settlers came to the area with the arrival of the Denver & Rio Grande Railroad. The narrow gauge railroad, which crossed La Veta Pass, was the highest U.S. railroad pass at the time. A depot, the La Veta Pass Narrow Gauge Railroad Depot, was built one block north of the fort. Papers for incorporation of the town were filed by noted railroad tycoon and entrepreneur William Jackson Palmer and Governor Alex Hunt in 1876. The fort is now operated by the Huerfano Historical Society. A post office called La Veta has been in operation since 1876. The community was named for a mineral deposit near the original town site, La Veta meaning "mineral vein" in Spanish.

On the morning of November 8, 1913, William Gambling, a miner who had refused to join the 1913–1914 United Mine Workers of America strike against the Colorado Fuel and Iron company, was intercepted and accosted by pro-strikers as he was traveling to the dentist in La Veta. He left the dentist's office later and was picked up by a car carrying three mine guards and a driver. A volley of gunfire was aimed at the car, killing all but Gambling. At least five men were arrested by the Colorado National Guard in relation to this incident, part of the early stages of the Colorado Coalfield War. Gambling, who managed to escape to a nearby dairy farm on Middle Creek, was attended to and aided back to the Oakview Mine the next day by the dairy farmer who routinely delivered milk to the mining camp.

Colorado's youngest-serving politician, Logan Taggart, was appointed to the La Veta town council at age 18 in 2013.

== Geography ==
According to the United States Census Bureau, the town has a total area of 1.37 square miles (3.5 km^{2}), all of it land. At one time (1919) there were sulfur springs in La Veta owned by Dr. Acker. They were last managed by W J Pierce of Colorado Springs.

== Demographics ==
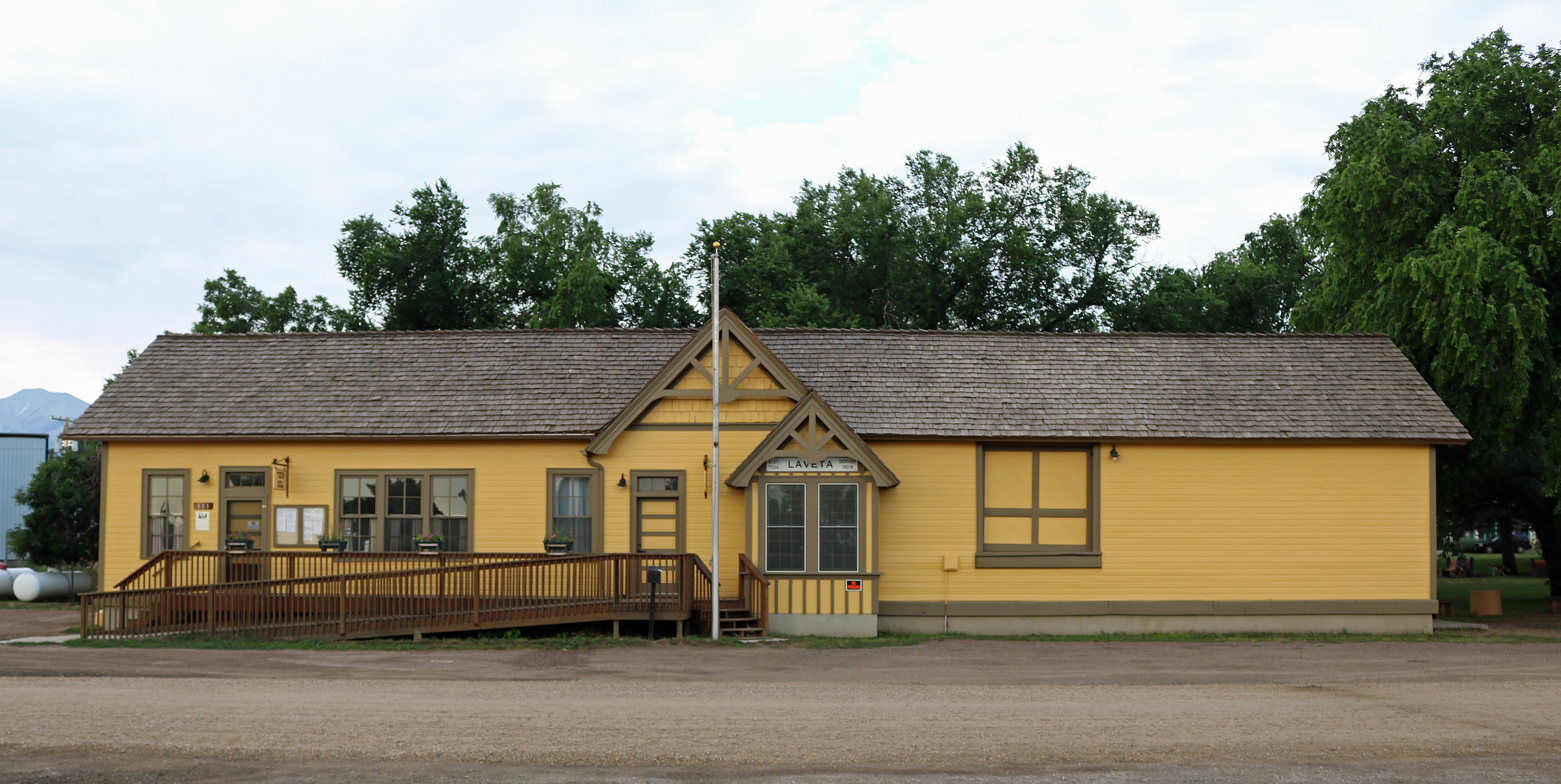
La Veta Town Hall

Historical population
Census	Pop.	Note	%±
1880	165		—
1890	361		118.8%
1900	254		−29.6%
1910	691		172.0%
1920	737		6.7%
1930	782		6.1%
1940	897		14.7%
1950	701		−21.9%
1960	632		−9.8%
1970	589		−6.8%
1980	611		3.7%
1990	726		18.8%
2000	924		27.3%
2010	800		−13.4%
2020	862		7.8%

== Education ==
The town is served by La Veta School District Re-2, which brands itself as La Veta Public Schools.

== Climate ==
Climate data for La Veta, Colorado (Elevation 7,037ft)
Month	Jan	Feb	Mar	Apr	May	Jun	Jul	Aug	Sep	Oct	Nov	Dec	Year
Record high °F (°C)	70 (21)	62 (17)	74 (23)	79 (26)	85 (29)	90 (32)	97 (36)	94 (34)	85 (29)	82 (28)	75 (24)	65 (18)	97 (36)
Mean daily maximum °F (°C)	46.9 (8.3)	47.9 (8.8)	48.5 (9.2)	57.2 (14.0)	67.6 (19.8)	76.7 (24.8)	83.7 (28.7)	81.1 (27.3)	72.9 (22.7)	66.3 (19.1)	57.3 (14.1)	44.0 (6.7)	62.5 (16.9)
Mean daily minimum °F (°C)	16.5 (−8.6)	12.7 (−10.7)	17.3 (−8.2)	31.3 (−0.4)	37.5 (3.1)	43.8 (6.6)	53.8 (12.1)	50.6 (10.3)	41.2 (5.1)	31.9 (−0.1)	24.6 (−4.1)	13.3 (−10.4)	31.2 (−0.4)
Record low °F (°C)	−25 (−32)	−10 (−23)	−17 (−27)	12 (−11)	17 (−8)	32 (0)	42 (6)	32 (0)	20 (−7)	5 (−15)	−5 (−21)	−17 (−27)	−25 (−32)
Average precipitation inches (mm)	0.40 (10)	1.00 (25)	1.42 (36)	1.47 (37)	1.63 (41)	1.49 (38)	3.14 (80)	2.50 (64)	1.95 (50)	0.68 (17)	0.40 (10)	0.84 (21)	16.94 (430)
Average snowfall inches (cm)	9.3 (24)	20.9 (53)	24.0 (61)	13.9 (35)	1.0 (2.5)	0 (0)	0 (0)	0 (0)	1.0 (2.5)	7.9 (20)	5.9 (15)	16.4 (42)	100.3 (255)
Source: The Western Regional Climate Center

== Parks and recreation ==
Nearby Cuchara Valley ski resort was closed in 2000. In the Late-2010s the property was re-opened as a Huferno County Park known as Parker-Fitzgerald Cuchara Mountain Park and operated by a non-profit as an all-season resort offering numerous activities. Despite unpredictable snow, residents of La Veta and surrounding towns are attempting to reopen the abandoned ski area with cat-skiing having opened in spring 2023 and trail access to skiers skinning up the season before as they work to revive the dormant chairlifts and have them certified.

== Notable person ==
- Bob McGraw (1895–1978), baseball pitcher

== See also ==
- Huerfano County, Colorado
