= Walker Ranch =

- Walker Ranch Historic District
- U.S. National Register of Historic Places
- U.S. Historic district
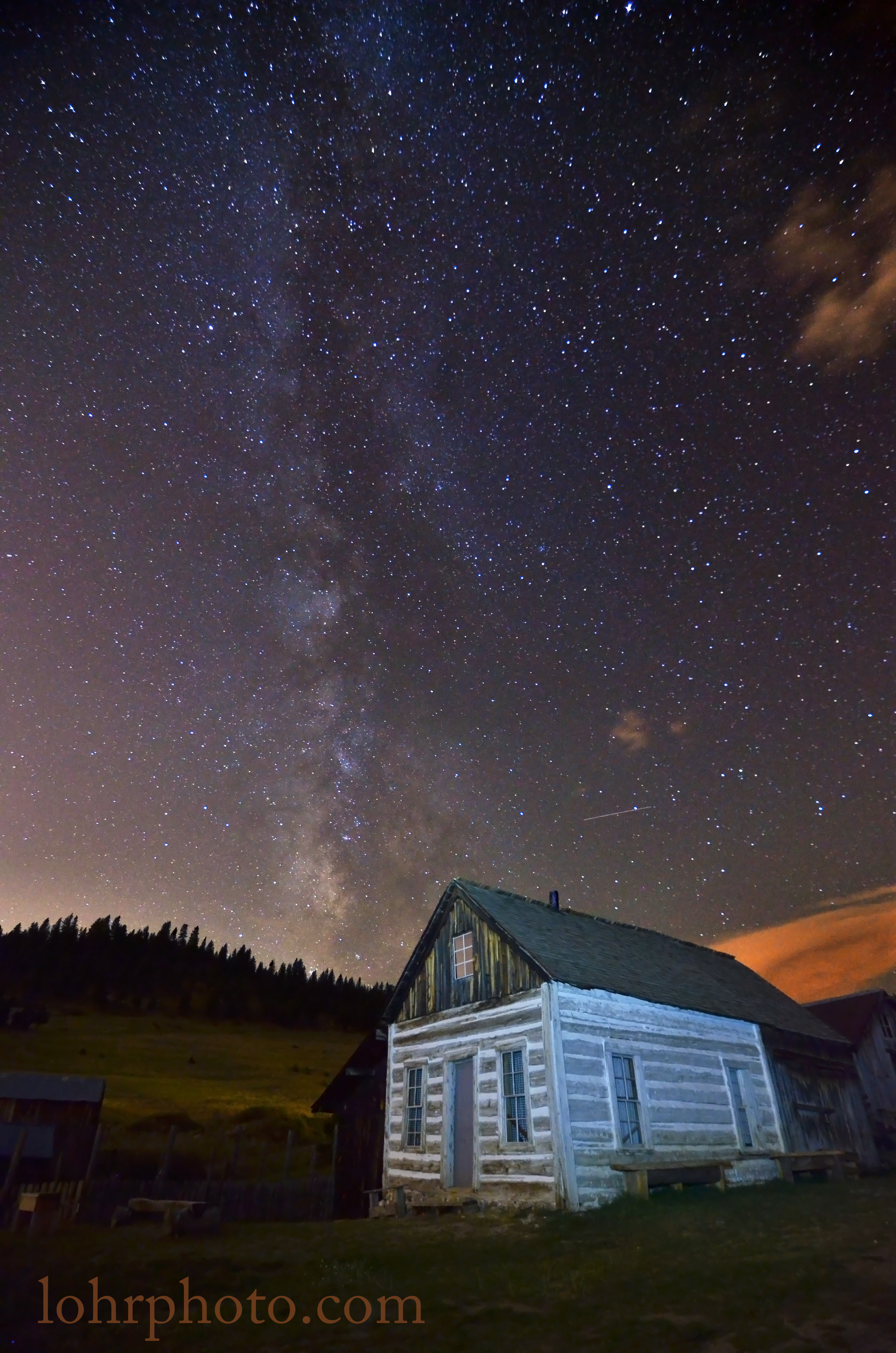
- The Walker Ranch House

- Location within Colorado Location within the United States
- Nearest city: Boulder, Colorado
- Coordinates: 39°57′14″N 105°20′03″W
- Area: 2,560 acres (10.4 km^{2})
- Built by: Walker, James A.
- NRHP reference No.: 84000798
- Added to NRHP: June 14, 1984

The Walker Ranch is a historic ranch in Boulder County, Colorado. The ranch was built by James A. Walker, who first settled in the Boulder area in 1865. Walker and his family initially lived in a log cabin on the ranch, which was built in 1865. In 1881, Walker and his family built and moved to a new ranch house. Walker engaged in a number of business ventures on the ranch and leased parts of the ranch to other businessmen, and the enterprises which took place on the ranch represent many of the region's industries at the time. Walker mainly raised cattle and milled lumber on the property, and an English firm mined gold using a cyanide mill; payments from the latter operation allowed Walker to eliminate his debt and purchase additional land for the ranch. Of the remaining historic buildings on the ranch, eleven are from Walker's homestead and his ranching operations, fourteen were part of Walker's sawmill operations, and fourteen are related to the cyanide mill. The ranch also includes five archaeological sites; three of these are remnants of aboriginal settlement in the area and two of these are Arapahoe sites, including a site Walker may have shared with the Arapahoe when he first came to the area.

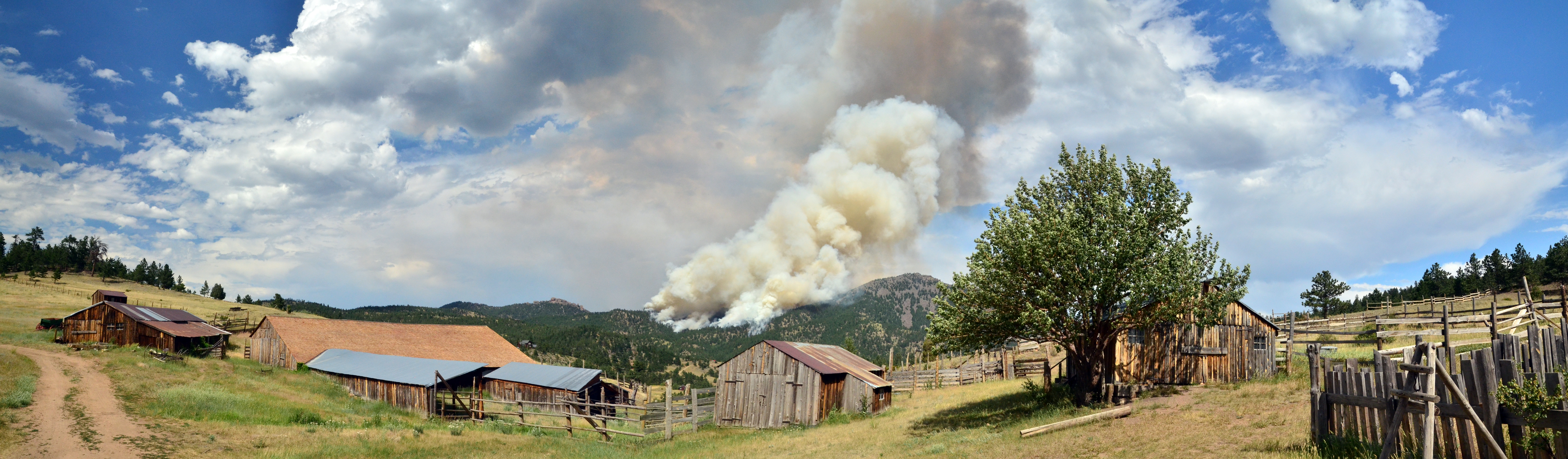
The ranch during the 2012 Flagstaff fire

The ranch was added to the National Register of Historic Places in 1984 as the Walker Ranch Historic District. In 1988, two additional parcels of land were determined to be associated with the ranch's historic activities and were added to the historic district.
