= Chatfield State Park =

State park in Colorado, United States

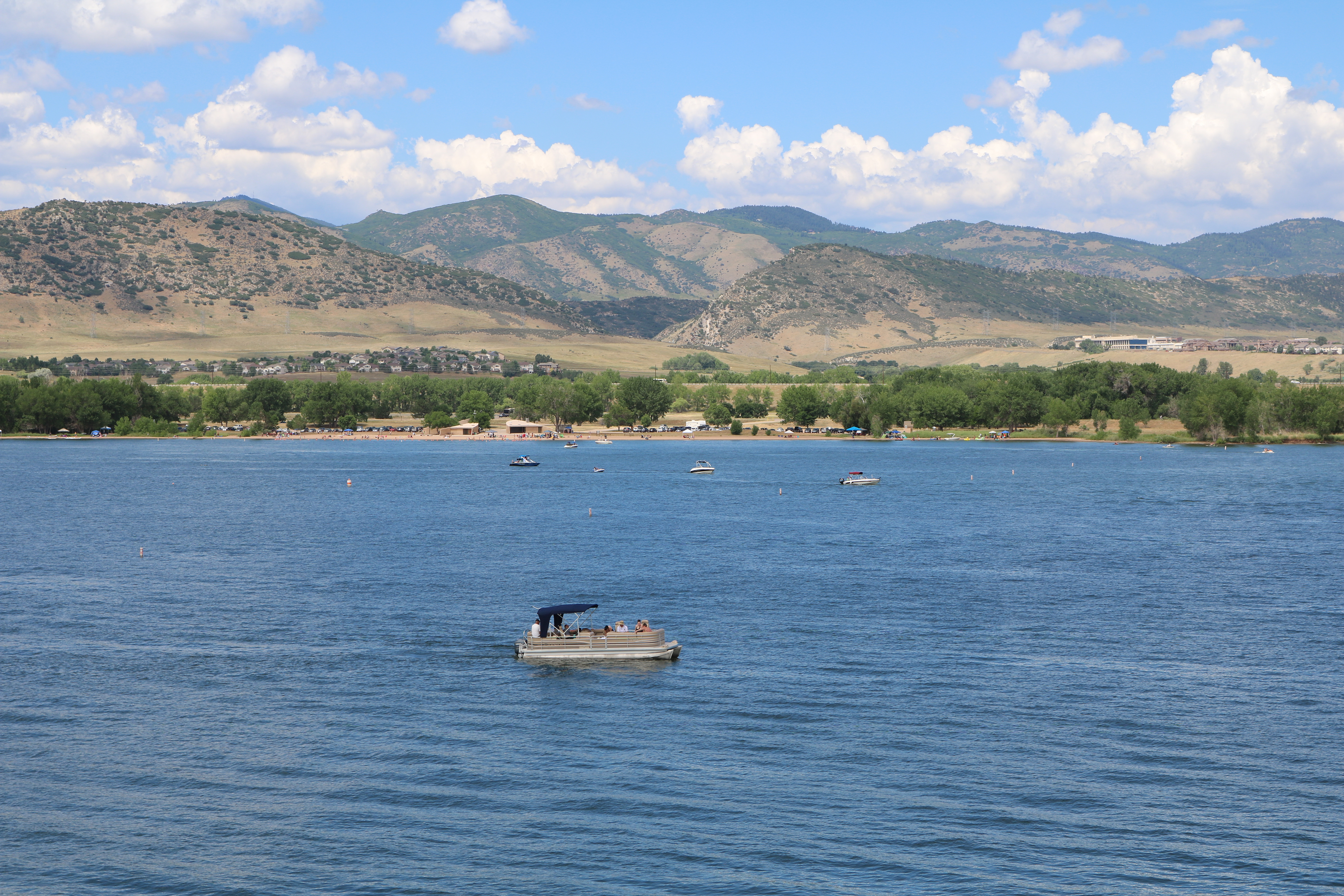
- Chatfield Reservoir.

- Location within Colorado
- Location: Douglas / Jefferson counties, Colorado, United States
- Nearest city: Littleton, Colorado
- Coordinates: 39.5366549°N 105.0694299°W
- Area: 3,895 acres (15.76 km^{2})
- Established: 1975
- Visitors: 2,159,653 (in 2021)
- Governing body: Colorado Parks and Wildlife
- Website: cpw.state.co.us/placestogo/parks/Chatfield

Chatfield State Park is a state park located in Douglas and Jefferson counties of Colorado, United States. The park centers on Chatfield Reservoir, a 1,423 acre surface area lake fed by the South Platte River and two other creeks, including Plum Creek.

== Reservoir Expansion Project ==
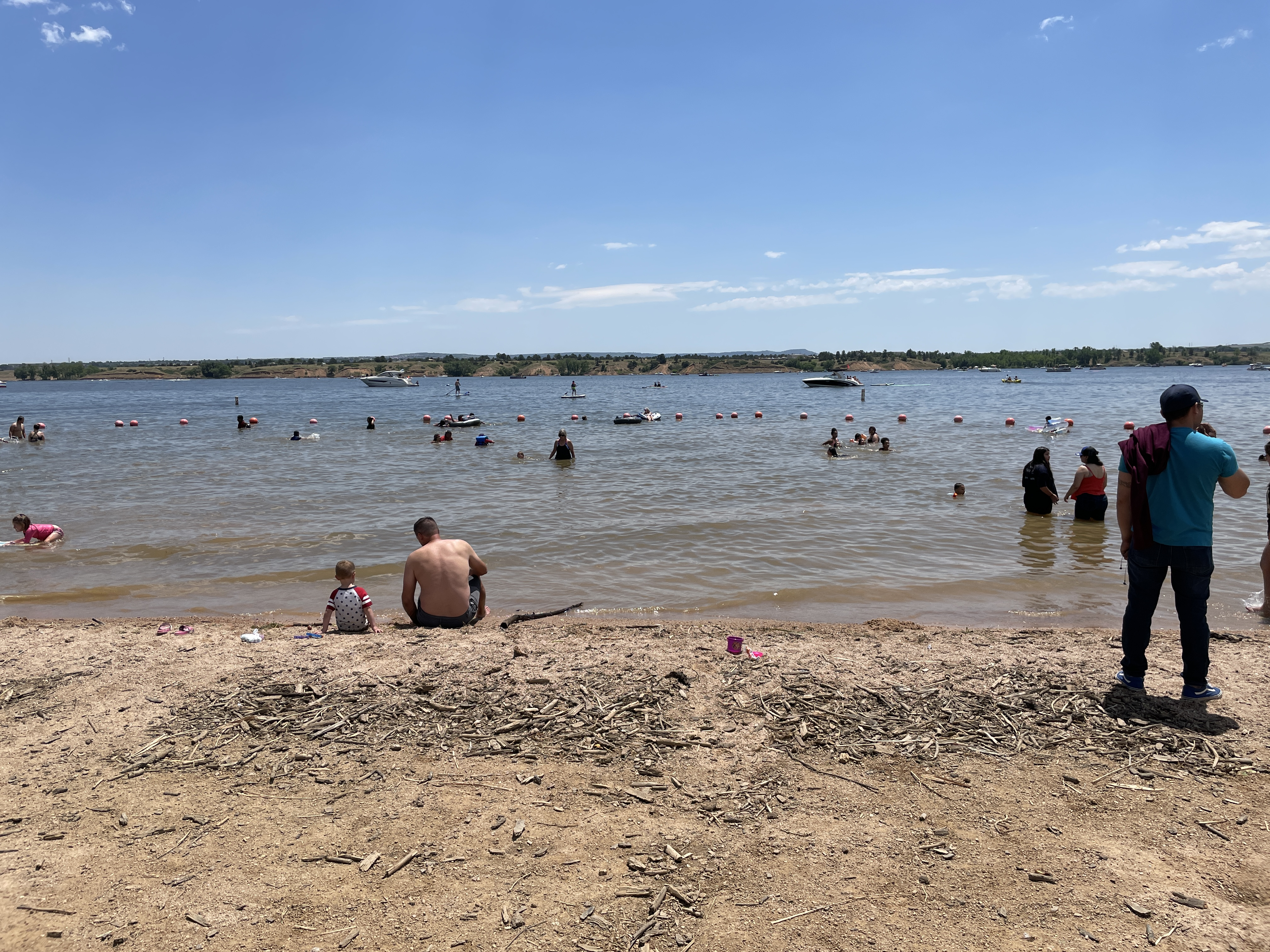
Chatfield Swim Beach

The Chatfield Reservoir Reallocation Project, a US$171 million construction project that took place between 2017 and 2020, created an additional 20,600 acre-feet (25,400,000 cubic meters) of water storage in the reservoir, raising its level by about 12 feet (3.7 meters). The project involved moving some of the surrounding park's facilities back from the new, higher lake levels.

== Wildlife ==
Over three hundred bird species both migrant and resident frequent Chatfield. Also a variety of mammals roam the park, including whitetail and mule deer, coyote, red fox, cottontail rabbit, prairie dogs and weasels.

== Audubon Center at Chatfield State Park ==
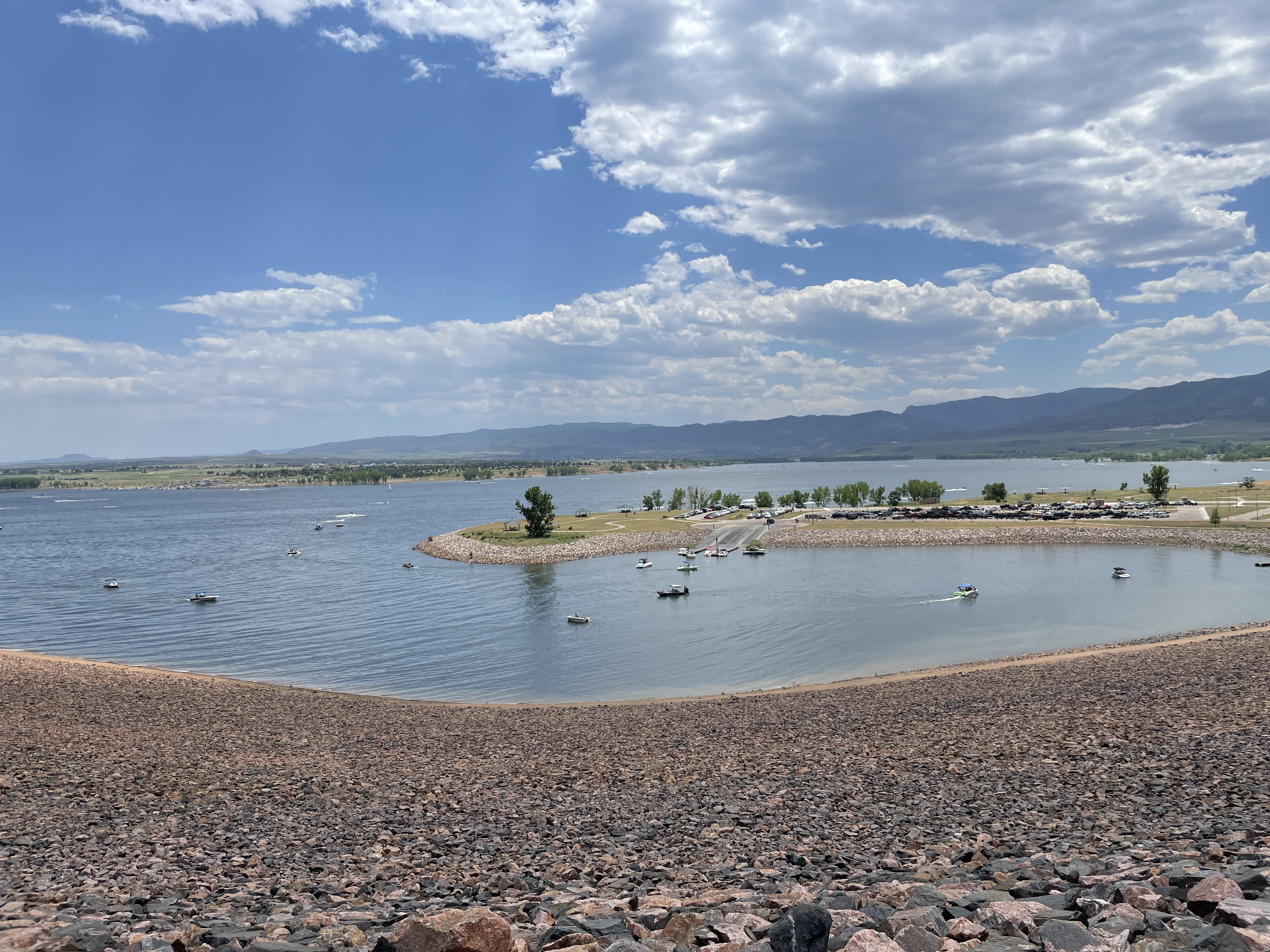
View of the park from the Chatfield Overlook

The Audubon Society of Greater Denver operates the Audubon Center at Chatfield State Park, a nature education center that offers classes, workshops and lectures for all ages, with an emphasis on children and families.

The center's facilities were originally part of a 5,000-acre (20 km^{2}) ranch for the Atchison family that became the headquarters for the Glenn L. Martin Company in 1955. The land became part of the Chatfield Dam construction project after a flood in 1965, and later became Chatfield State Park. The Audubon Society of Greater Denver was invited by Colorado State Parks to develop a nature center in 1998 out of the old 1940s ranch buildings. In 2004 the Society completed the renovation of the stone garage building into an outdoor learning lab. In 2006 the stone farmhouse was rehabilitated for classroom space and an outdoor amphitheater was constructed. The Society is building a visitor center that will house natural history exhibits, a nature library, an auditorium and a nature-based preschool.
