= Central City/Black Hawk Historic District =

Historic district in Colorado, United States

- U.S. National Register of Historic Places
- U.S. National Historic Landmark District
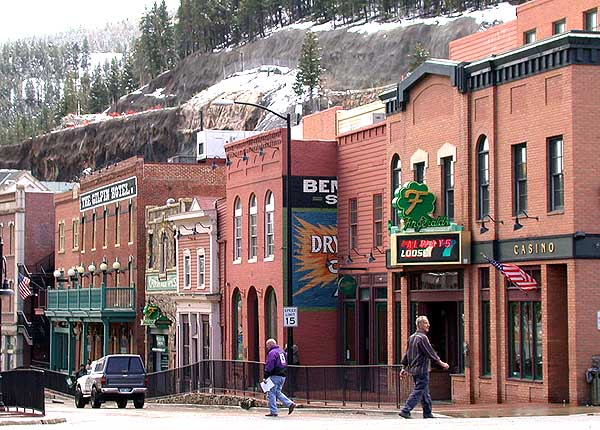
- Restored historic buildings in downtown Black Hawk

- Location within Colorado Location within the United States
- Location: Central City and Black Hawk, Colorado
- Coordinates: 39°48′4″N 105°30′27″W
- Area: 286.5 acres (115.9 ha)
- Built: 1859
- NRHP reference No.: 66000246

Significant dates
- Added to NRHP: October 15, 1966
- Designated NHLD: July 4, 1961

The Central City/Black Hawk Historic District (formerly just the Central City Historic District) is a National Historic Landmark District that encompasses the developed areas of Central City and Black Hawk, Colorado, United States. They are adjacent former gold mining camps in the Front Range of the Rocky Mountains in Gilpin County, Colorado. For a time, the area was known as the Richest Square Mile on Earth, and was the largest urban area of the Colorado Territory in the 1870s.

The district was designated a National Historic Landmark on July 4, 1961, for its well-preserved early mining community architecture and history.

== History ==
On May 5, 1859, John H. Gregory discovered a rich deposit of gold in hard rock, the first such discovery in the Rocky Mountain region. Thousands of miners flooded into Gregory Gulch in the next few months in the Pike's Peak Gold Rush. Several mining camps were thrown up near the Gregory Lode, and these camps eventually coalesced into Central City and Black Hawk. The area around the Gregory Lode quickly came to be known as the Richest Square Mile on Earth. By the time the Territory of Colorado was formed on February 28, 1861, Central City was already the largest city in the entire territory, though Denver was made the state capital.

The Central City/Black Hawk area was a basically continuous arc of mining camps and urban development, with a population of more than 3,000 at its height in 1870. Development extended all the way up to Nevadaville, now a ghost town within the Central City limits. Although the area was settled on the basis of placer mining claims, these played out quickly, and underground mining came to dominate. Between 1859 and 1893, Gilpin County produced more gold than any other area in the American West. The mines were largely played out by the end of the 19th century, and the population of the area crashed in the years before World War I, during which mining was completely suspended. The area's population has never returned to the level of its heyday.

In the 1990s, casinos were developed in both Central City and Black Hawk, and they have seen a resurgence in attention and funds as a result.

== District boundaries ==
Central City's built-up area was designated a National Historic Landmark in 1961 (as the Central City Historic District), and was added to the National Register of Historic Places in 1966. In the 1990s, the district was renamed and expanded, to include the built-up parts of Black Hawk, the ghost town of Nevadaville, and the cemetery area of Central City, located up Eureka Gulch from downtown Central City. The landmarked area, covering more than 280 acres (110 ha), excludes much of the former mining infrastructure visible in the hills above the communities.

== See also ==
- List of National Historic Landmarks in Colorado
- National Register of Historic Places listings in Gilpin County, Colorado
- Front Range
- Pike's Peak Gold Rush
