= Willowbrook Amphitheatre =

Cave-like structure in Colorado, United States

Coordinates: 39°36′28″N 105°10′29″W

Willowbrook Amphitheatre, also known as Chief Colorow's Cave, is a cave-like structure composed of Paleozoic Age Fountain Formation sandstone. The top is open to the sky. Willowbrook Amphitheatre is located in the Willowbrook subdivision in Jefferson County, near Morrison, Colorado, south of Red Rocks Park and Red Rocks Amphitheatre. It is located on private land, and is restricted to the use of the association residents for weddings and local events.

Colorow's Cave was named for Chief Colorow who is said to have used the cave along with his band for temporary shelter during his summer visits.
