= National Register of Historic Places listings in Jefferson County, Colorado =

Location of Jefferson County in Colorado

This is a list of the National Register of Historic Places listings in Jefferson County, Colorado.

This is intended to be a complete list of the properties and districts on the National Register of Historic Places in Jefferson County, Colorado, United States. The locations of National Register properties and districts for which the latitude and longitude coordinates are included below, may be seen in a map.

There are 87 properties and districts listed on the National Register in the county, including 1 National Historic Landmark.

This National Park Service list is complete through NPS recent listings posted August 21, 2026.

== Current listings ==
	Name on the Register	Image	Date listed	Location	City or town	Description
1	Ammunition Igloo	Ammunition Igloo	May 20, 1993 (#93000379)	15001 Denver West Parkway; 39°44′33″N 105°10′22″W	Golden	
2	Arvada Downtown	Arvada Downtown	July 15, 1998 (#98000854)	Roughly bounded by Ralston Rd., N. Teller St., Grandview Ave., and N Yukon St. 39°48′04″N 105°04′46″W	Arvada	
3	Arvada Flour Mill	Arvada Flour Mill	April 24, 1975 (#75000521)	5580 Wadsworth Boulevard; 39°47′54″N 105°04′51″W	Arvada	
4	Astor House Hotel	Astor House Hotel	March 1, 1973 (#73000478)	822 12th St. 39°45′19″N 105°13′18″W	Golden	
5	Barnes-Peery House	Barnes-Peery House	October 12, 2001 (#01001105)	622 Water St. 39°45′29″N 105°13′16″W	Golden	
6	James H. Baugh House	James H. Baugh House	August 14, 2012 (#12000495)	11361 W. 44th Ave. 39°46′43″N 105°07′33″W	Wheat Ridge	
7	Bear Creek Canyon Scenic Mountain Drive	Bear Creek Canyon Scenic Mountain Drive	November 15, 1990 (#90001706)	Section of State Highway 74 between Morrison and Idledale; 39°39′22″N 105°13′32″W	Morrison	
8	Bergen Park	Bergen Park	November 15, 1990 (#90001707)	State Highway 74 south of Interstate 70; 39°41′21″N 105°21′42″W	Evergreen	
9	Blue Jay Inn	Blue Jay Inn	October 1, 1974 (#74000580)	Deckers Rd. (Jefferson CR 126); 39°23′17″N 105°16′23″W	Buffalo Creek	
10	Bradford House II	Bradford House II	February 2, 2001 (#01000031)	North of Killdeer Ln. 39°36′07″N 105°10′19″W	Littleton	
11	Bradford House III Archeological Site		April 8, 1980 (#80000906)	On the Ken-Caryl Ranch; 39°36′05″N 105°10′35″W	Morrison	
12	Robert Boyles Bradford Property		February 2, 2015 (#14001235)	Address Restricted; 39°35′59″N 105°10′26″W	Morrison	
13	Brook Forest Inn	Brook Forest Inn	July 29, 2009 (#09000567)	8136 S. Brook Forest Rd. 39°34′46″N 105°22′56″W	Evergreen	
14	Building 710, Defense Civil Preparedness Agency, Region 6 Operations Center	Building 710, Defense Civil Preparedness Agency, Region 6 Operations Center	March 2, 2000 (#00000104)	Denver Federal Center; 39°42′40″N 105°07′13″W	Lakewood	
15	Calvary Episcopal Church	Calvary Episcopal Church	March 3, 1995 (#95000186)	1300 Arapahoe St. 39°45′14″N 105°13′16″W	Golden	
16	Camp George West Historic District	Camp George West Historic District	February 11, 1993 (#92001865)	15000 S. Golden Rd. 39°44′12″N 105°10′20″W	Golden	
17	Churches Ranch	Churches Ranch	July 23, 1998 (#98000883)	17999 W. 60th Ave. 39°48′24″N 105°12′20″W	Arvada	
18	Colorado Amphitheater	Colorado Amphitheater	May 20, 1993 (#93000378)	15001 Denver West Parkway; 39°44′36″N 105°10′33″W	Golden	
19	Colorado National Guard Armory	Colorado National Guard Armory	December 18, 1978 (#78000860)	1301 Arapahoe St. 39°45′13″N 105°13′14″W	Golden	
20	Colorow Point Park	Colorow Point Park	November 15, 1990 (#90001712)	900 Colorow Rd. 39°43′55″N 105°14′55″W	Golden	
21	Conifer Junction Schoolhouse	Conifer Junction Schoolhouse	February 10, 2014 (#13001167)	26951 Barkley Rd. 39°32′06″N 105°18′28″W	Conifer	
22	Herman Coors House	Herman Coors House	October 17, 1997 (#97001227)	1817 Arapahoe St. 39°44′58″N 105°12′58″W	Golden	
23	Corwina Park, O'Fallon Park, Pence Park	Corwina Park, O'Fallon Park, Pence Park	December 28, 1990 (#90001708)	Roughly the area southeast of Kittredge and the junction of Hwy 74 and Myers Gulch Rds. 39°38′49″N 105°17′13″W	Evergreen	
24	Katherine Craig Park	Katherine Craig Park	June 30, 1995 (#95000797)	Along Interstate 70/U.S. Highway 40 northwest of Morrison; 39°42′42″N 105°17′12″W	Morrison	
25	Crown Hill Burial Park	Crown Hill Burial Park	July 24, 2008 (#08000708)	7777 W. 29th Ave. 39°45′30″N 105°05′34″W	Wheat Ridge	
26	Davies' Chuck Wagon Diner	Davies' Chuck Wagon Diner	July 2, 1997 (#97000619)	9495 W. Colfax Ave. 39°44′26″N 105°06′11″W	Lakewood	
27	Deaton Sculptured House	Deaton Sculptured House	February 24, 2004 (#02000385)	24501 Ski Hill Dr. 39°42′02″N 105°16′36″W	Genesee	
28	Dedisse Park	Dedisse Park	November 15, 1990 (#90001709)	29614 Upper Bear Creek Rd. 39°28′49″N 105°19′42″W	Evergreen	
29	Denver and Intermountain Railroad Interurban No. 25	Denver and Intermountain Railroad Interurban No. 25	January 12, 2012 (#11001016)	W. 6th Ave. & Kipling St. 39°43′38″N 105°06′35″W	Lakewood	
30	Denver and Rio Grande Western Railroad Caboose No. 0578	Denver and Rio Grande Western Railroad Caboose No. 0578	November 4, 2003 (#02000678)	17155 W. 44th Ave. 39°46′17″N 105°11′36″W	Golden	located at the Colorado Railroad Museum
31	District No. 17 School-Medlen School	District No. 17 School-Medlen School	April 14, 2015 (#15000139)	South Turkey Creek Road; 39°33′41″N 105°13′16″W	Morrison	District school; owned by county historical society.
32	Evergreen Conference District	Evergreen Conference District	May 1, 1979 (#79000611)	State Highway 74; 39°38′13″N 105°18′48″W	Evergreen	
33	Everhardt Ranch	Everhardt Ranch	May 7, 1980 (#80000903)	Southeast of Evergreen; 39°36′06″N 105°16′31″W	Evergreen	
34	Fillius Park	Fillius Park	February 24, 1995 (#95000108)	State Highway 74 northwest of Evergreen; 39°41′45″N 105°21′09″W	Evergreen	
35	First Presbyterian Church of Golden-Unger House	First Presbyterian Church of Golden-Unger House	March 14, 1991 (#91000294)	809 15th St. 39°45′09″N 105°13′07″W	Golden	
36	The Fort	The Fort	July 14, 2006 (#06000585)	19192 State Highway 8; 39°37′44″N 105°11′31″W	Morrison	Boundary increase approved July 27, 2020.
37	Fruitdale Grade School	Fruitdale Grade School	March 20, 2013 (#13000078)	10801 W. 44th Ave. 39°46′43″N 105°07′08″W	Wheat Ridge	
38	Genesee Park	Genesee Park	November 15, 1990 (#90001710)	26771 Genesee Ln. 39°42′53″N 105°18′44″W	Genesee	
39	Golden Cemetery	Golden Cemetery	April 18, 2012 (#12000200)	755 Ulysses St. 39°43′43″N 105°11′49″W	Golden	
40	Golden High School	Golden High School	March 14, 1997 (#97000229)	710 10th St. 39°45′30″N 105°13′21″W	Golden	Old Golden High School is no longer used by the current Golden High School
41	Green Mercantile Store	Green Mercantile Store	October 1, 1974 (#74000581)	Northwest of Buffalo Creek; 39°23′36″N 105°16′38″W	Buffalo Creek	
42	Green Mountain Ranch	Green Mountain Ranch	October 1, 1974 (#74000582)	South of Buffalo Creek on Deckers Rd. 39°17′43″N 105°16′28″W	Buffalo Creek	
43	Hildebrand Ranch	Hildebrand Ranch	March 13, 1975 (#75000524)	7 miles (11 km) southwest of Littleton off Deer Creek Canyon Rd. 39°33′05″N 105°06′03″W	Littleton	
44	Hill Section, Golden Hill Cemetery	Hill Section, Golden Hill Cemetery	July 31, 1995 (#94001230)	12000 W. Colfax Ave. 39°44′22″N 105°08′12″W	Lakewood	
45	Hiwan Homestead	Hiwan Homestead	April 9, 1974 (#74000583)	Meadow Dr. 39°38′22″N 105°19′21″W	Evergreen	
46	Humphrey House	Humphrey House	December 31, 1974 (#74000584)	620 S. Soda Creek Rd. 39°42′14″N 105°21′53″W	Evergreen	
47	Jewish Consumptives' Relief Society	Jewish Consumptives' Relief Society	June 26, 1980 (#80000905)	6401 W. Colfax Ave. 39°44′37″N 105°04′03″W	Lakewood	
48	La Hacienda	La Hacienda	July 20, 1973 (#73000477)	On State Highway 126 off U.S. Highway 285; 39°23′38″N 105°16′16″W	Buffalo Creek	
49	Lariat Trail Scenic Mountain Drive	Lariat Trail Scenic Mountain Drive	November 15, 1990 (#90001711)	Lookout Mountain Rd. south of U.S. Highway 6 to Golden Reservoir; 39°44′23″N 105°14′23″W	Golden	
50	Little Park	Little Park	February 24, 1995 (#95000111)	Miller Ln. (State Highway 74) southwest of Idledale; 39°39′22″N 105°14′45″W	Idledale	
51	LoDaisKa Site	LoDaisKa Site	September 25, 2003 (#03000962)	SH 8 At US 285; 39°37′39″N 105°11′38″W	Morrison	
52	Lookout Mountain Park	Lookout Mountain Park	November 15, 1990 (#90001713)	987½ Lookout Mountain Rd. 39°43′58″N 105°14′28″W	Golden	
53	Lorraine Lodge	Lorraine Lodge	January 18, 1984 (#84000858)	Southwest of Golden; 39°43′35″N 105°14′53″W	Golden	
54	Loveland Building and Coors Building	Loveland Building and Coors Building	May 16, 1996 (#96000544)	1122 and 1120 Washington Ave. 39°45′20″N 105°13′16″W	Golden	
55	Magic Mountain Site	Magic Mountain Site	August 21, 1980 (#80000904)	Address Restricted	Golden	
56	Midway House	Midway House	September 18, 1990 (#90001479)	9345 U.S. Highway 285; 39°32′47″N 105°16′37″W	Conifer	
57	Morrison Historic District	Morrison Historic District	September 28, 1976 (#76000561)	State Highway 8; 39°39′15″N 105°11′30″W	Morrison	
58	Morrison Schoolhouse	Morrison Schoolhouse	September 4, 1974 (#74000585)	226 Spring St. 39°39′07″N 105°11′21″W	Morrison	
59	Mount Vernon House	Mount Vernon House	November 20, 1970 (#70000162)	About 1 mile (1.6 km) south of the Golden city limits at the junction of Interstate 70, State Highway 26, and Mount Vernon Canyon Rd. 39°41′41″N 105°12′30″W	Golden	
60	North Fork Historic District	North Fork Historic District	October 9, 1974 (#74000586)	Both sides of the South Platte River from Pine to South Platte, in the Pike National Forest; also Longview, Foxton, Argyle and Pine Grove Expansions; 39°24′35″N 105°14′57″W	Pine and South Platte	Second set of boundaries represents a boundary increase of October 8, 2008
61	Office of Civil Defense Emergency Operations Center	Office of Civil Defense Emergency Operations Center	December 16, 1999 (#99001541)	Denver Federal Center; 39°42′56″N 105°07′08″W	Lakewood	
62	Peterson House	Peterson House	September 10, 1981 (#81000184)	7840 W. Ohio Avenue; 39°38′24″N 105°07′45″W	Lakewood	
63	Pioneer Sod House	Pioneer Sod House	March 14, 1973 (#73000479)	4610 Robb St. 39°46′51″N 105°07′30″W	Wheat Ridge	
64	Quaintance Block	Quaintance Block	March 25, 1994 (#94000261)	805 13th St. 39°45′15″N 105°13′13″W	Golden	
65	Queen of Heaven Orphanage Summer Camp	Queen of Heaven Orphanage Summer Camp	January 14, 2000 (#99001666)	20189 Cabrini Boulevard; 39°42′14″N 105°13′39″W	Golden	
66	Red Rocks Park District	Red Rocks Park District	May 18, 1990 (#90000725)	16351 County Road 93; 39°39′41″N 105°12′15″W	Morrison	
67	Reno Park Addition Historic District	Reno Park Addition Historic District	September 29, 1999 (#99001183)	Roughly bounded by Allison St., Ralston Rd., Yukon St., and Reno Dr. 39°47′59″N 105°05′02″W	Arvada	
68	Richards Mansion	Richards Mansion	September 15, 1977 (#77000379)	5349 W. 27th Ave. 39°45′20″N 105°03′25″W	Wheat Ridge	
69	Rio Grande Southern Railroad Engine No. 20	Rio Grande Southern Railroad Engine No. 20	December 14, 2000 (#00001003)	17155 W. 44th Ave. 39°46′20″N 105°11′36″W	Golden	located at the Colorado Railroad Museum
70	Rio Grande Southern Railroad, Motor No. 2	Rio Grande Southern Railroad, Motor No. 2	February 14, 1997 (#97000049)	17155 W. 44th Ave. 39°46′17″N 105°11′36″W	Golden	located at the Colorado Railroad Museum
71	Rio Grande Southern Railroad, Motor No. 6	Rio Grande Southern Railroad, Motor No. 6	February 19, 1997 (#97000050)	17155 W. 44th Ave. 39°46′17″N 105°11′36″W	Golden	located at the Colorado Railroad Museum
72	Rio Grande Southern Railroad, Motor No. 7	Rio Grande Southern Railroad, Motor No. 7	February 28, 1997 (#97000161)	17155 W. 44th Ave. 39°46′18″N 105°11′35″W	Golden	located at the Colorado Railroad Museum
73	Rockland Community Church and Cemetery	Rockland Community Church and Cemetery	August 5, 2009 (#09000584)	24225 Rockland Rd. 39°42′35″N 105°16′23″W	Golden	
74	Rocky Flats Plant	Rocky Flats Plant	May 19, 1997 (#97000377)	Approximately 2 miles (3.2 km) southeast of the junction of State Highways 93 and 198; 39°53′31″N 105°12′09″W	Golden	
75	Samuel and Albina Romano House	Samuel and Albina Romano House	September 26, 2016 (#16000668)	16300 S. Golden Rd. 39°44′06″N 105°10′59″W	Golden	
76	Rooney Ranch	Rooney Ranch	February 13, 1975 (#75000522)	South of Golden at the junction of Rooney Rd. and Alameda Parkway; 39°41′10″N 105°11′35″W	Golden	
77	Russell-Graves House	Russell-Graves House	May 9, 1983 (#83001296)	5605 Yukon St. 39°47′59″N 105°04′56″W	Arvada	
78	Schnell Farm	Schnell Farm	February 14, 1997 (#97000048)	3113 S. Wadsworth Boulevard; 39°39′37″N 105°04′59″W	Lakewood	
79	John C. Shaffer Barn	John C. Shaffer Barn	July 12, 2019 (#100004188)	14422 W. Ken Caryl Ave. 39°35′05″N 105°09′36″W	Littleton vicinity	
80	South Ranch		April 18, 2003 (#03000227)	Address Restricted	Lakewood	
81	Starbuck Park	Starbuck Park	June 30, 1995 (#95000796)	State Highway 74 through Bear Creek Canyon, south of Idledale; 39°39′47″N 105°14′23″W	Idledale	
82	Staunton Ranch-Rural Historic Landscape	Staunton Ranch-Rural Historic Landscape	December 4, 2012 (#12000991)	11559 Upper Ranch Dr. 39°30′17″N 105°23′24″W	Pine	Extends into Park County
83	Stocke-Walter Addition Historic District	Stocke-Walter Addition Historic District	September 24, 1999 (#99001182)	Roughly along Saulsbury St., Ralston Rd., Grandview Ave., and Reed St. 39°48′02″N 105°04′26″W	Arvada	
84	Stone House	Stone House	May 1, 1975 (#75000523)	West Yale Avenue and South Estes Street; 39°39′56″N 105°05′36″W	Lakewood	
85	Thiede Ranch		January 11, 1996 (#95001509)	22258 Shingle Creek Rd. 39°41′50″N 105°14′54″W	Golden	
86	Tower of Memories	Tower of Memories	September 25, 1987 (#87001725)	8500 W. 29th Ave. 39°45′30″N 105°05′32″W	Wheat Ridge	
87	Twelfth Street Historic Residential District	Twelfth Street Historic Residential District	September 22, 1983 (#83001321)	Roughly bounded by 11th, 13th, Elm, and Arapahoe Sts. 39°45′13″N 105°13′25″W	Golden	

== See also ==
- List of National Historic Landmarks in Colorado
- List of National Register of Historic Places in Colorado
- Bibliography of Colorado
- Geography of Colorado
- History of Colorado
- Index of Colorado-related articles
- List of Colorado-related lists
- Outline of Colorado
