= Quaintance =

Quaintance is a surname. Notable people with the surname include:

- Altus Lacy Quaintance (1870–1958), American entomologist
- George Quaintance (1902–1957), American artist
- Jayden Quaintance (born 2007), American college basketball player

== See also ==
- Quaintance Block
