= Igloo (disambiguation) =

An igloo is a type of shelter built of snow, originally built by the Inuit.

Igloo may also refer to:

== Buildings ==
- Bunker
  - Igloo, South Dakota, former United States ordnance depot
  - Ammunition Igloo, Colorado, United States
- The Igloo, a nickname for the Pittsburgh Civic Arena
- Igloo, a module on the Spacelab
- Igloo, a large half-cylindrical building used for industrial purposes, similar to a Nissen hut

== Companies and products ==
- Igloo Products, an American manufacturer of ice chests
- Igloo Records, a Belgian record label
- Igloo Studio, a Thai-based animation/production company in Bangkok
- Igloo (TV), a New Zealand pay TV service

== Places ==
- Igloo Hill, Antarctic peninsula
- Igloo Mountain, in Denali National Park, Alaska
- Igloo Spur, a spur near the Antarctic continent

== Other ==
- Igloo (1932 film), an American documentary film
- Igloo (2019 film), a Tamil film
- "Igloo", a song from the Where the Wild Things Are: Motion Picture Soundtrack
- Igloo or Iggy (1924–1931), the dog which accompanied Richard Evelyn Byrd on his expeditions to the North and South Poles
