= Green Mountain Ranch =

- U.S. National Register of Historic Places
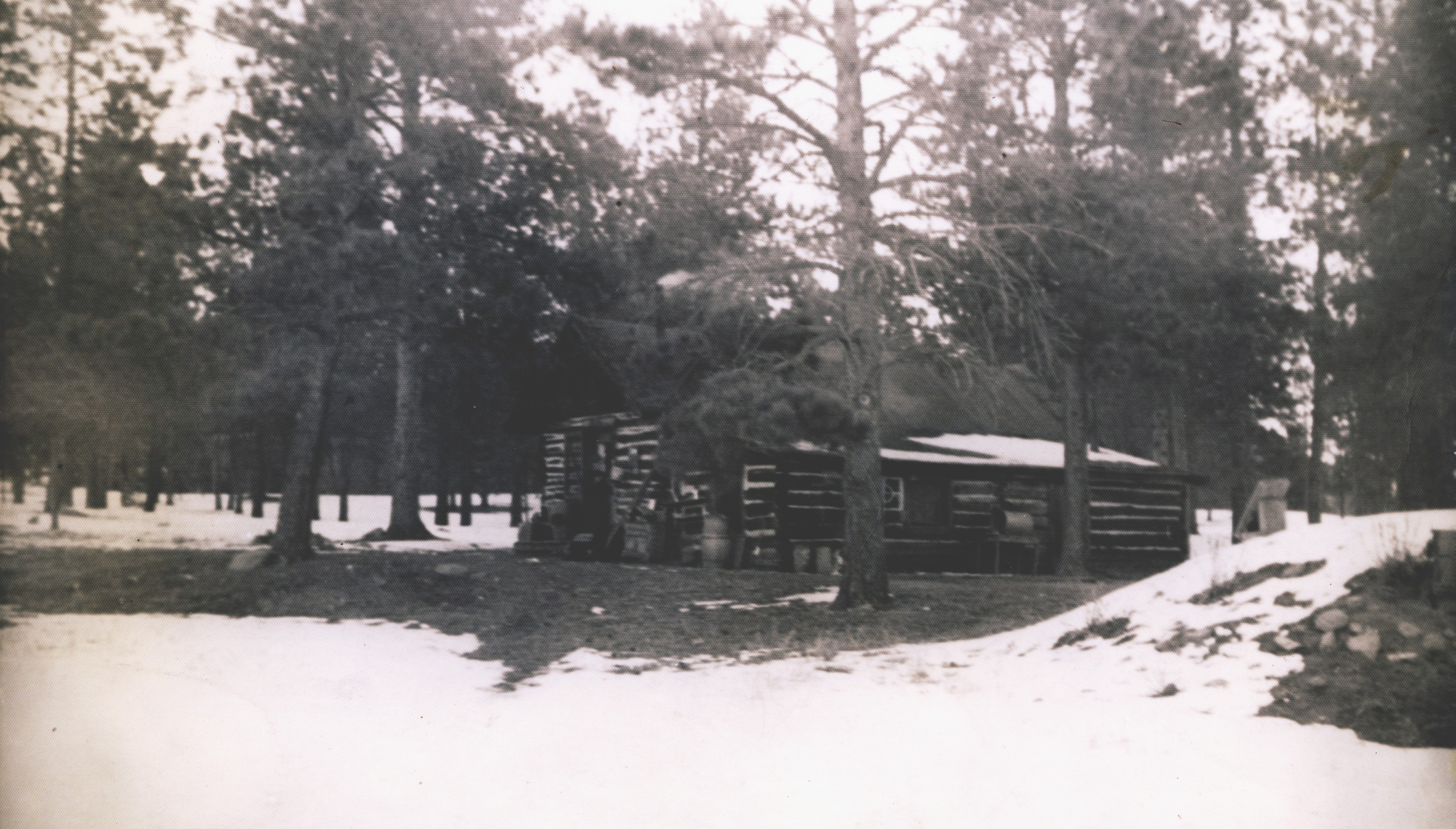

- Location within Colorado Location within the United States
- Location: Hwy. 126, near Buffalo Creek, Colorado
- Coordinates: 39°17′45″N 105°16′30″W
- Area: 5 acres (2.0 ha)
- Built: c.1900
- Built by: Edwin Eugene Culver
- NRHP reference No.: 74000582
- Added to NRHP: October 1, 1974

The Green Mountain Ranch, located southwest on Deckers Road (Highway 126) from Buffalo Creek, Colorado, was built around 1900 by Edwin Eugene Culver. There are only two remaining buildings, as the rest were torn down in the construction of Highway 126.

The property was homesteaded in 1900 by Culver, who built a house, corrals, and outbuildings. He ran cattle until 1927. It was listed on the National Register of Historic Places in 1974.

The main building is a one-story hewn log house, about 65 by 20 feet (19.8 m × 6.1 m) in plan.

When listed on the National Register in 1974, it was still the home of Mrs. Ethel Myers, daughter of the original owner, and it was "in exactly the same condition as when it was originally built. Mrs. Myers, in her 80s, still carries in water from a spring rather than have a hand pump in the kitchen. There is no electricity, no plumbing. The oil hanging lamp in the dining room is original. Heat emanates only from the original source, the fireplace. It is an anachronism."

A second contributing building is a buggy house.

== See also ==
- National Register of Historic Places listings in Jefferson County, Colorado
