= Green Mercantile Store =

- U.S. National Register of Historic Places
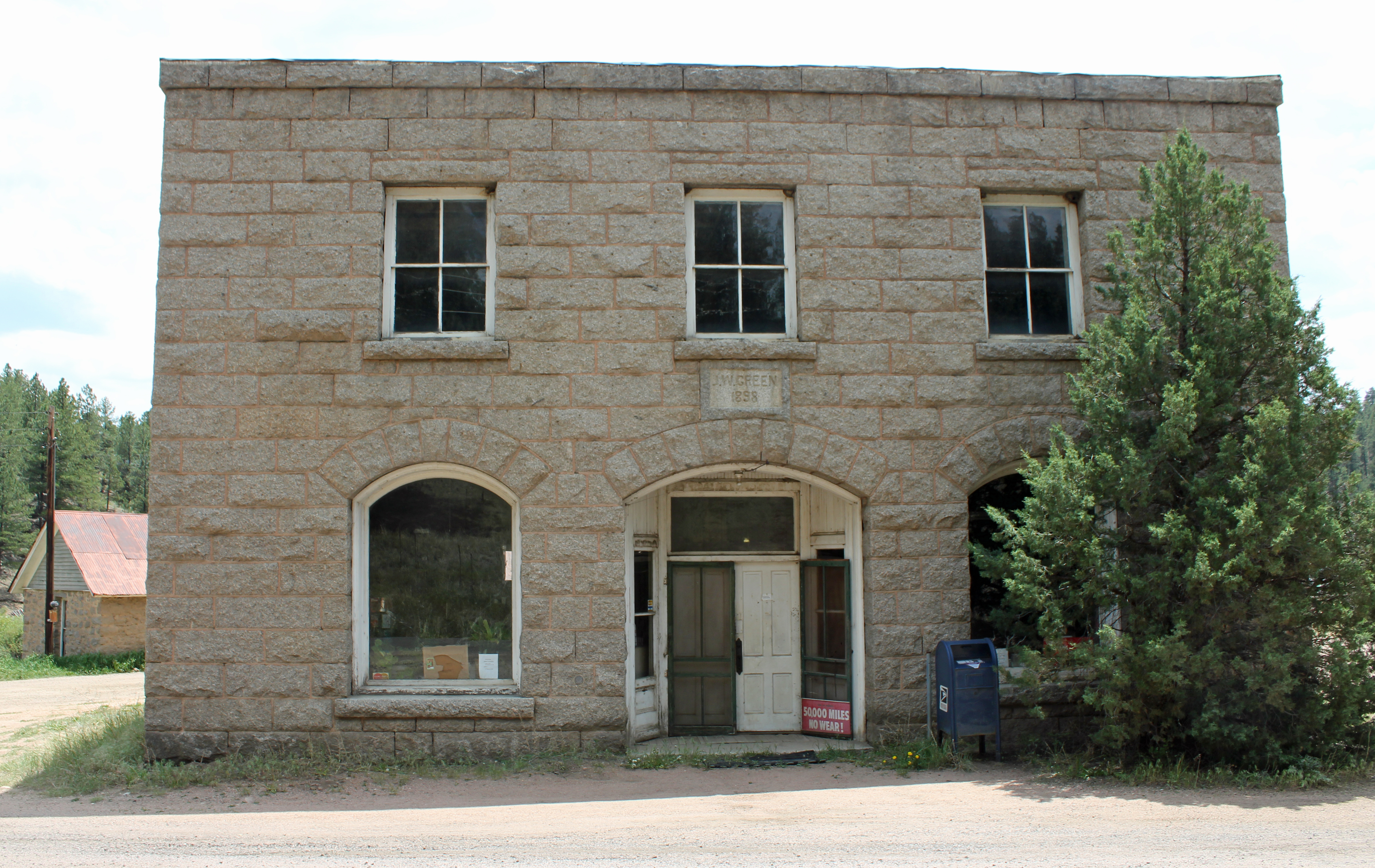
- The store in 2013.

- Location within Colorado Location within the United States
- Location: 17706 Jefferson County Road 96
- Coordinates: 39°23′36″N 105°16′40″W
- Built: 1898
- NRHP reference No.: 74000581

The Green Mercantile Store, located in Buffalo Creek, Colorado, is a two-story building constructed of native granite in 1898 by John W. Green, Sr. The building is also home for the Buffalo Creek post office.

The original Green Mercantile was a wooden hotel building built in 1883 and purchased by John Wesley Green. The mercantile became the post office as well in 1886 when Green was appointed postmaster by Grover Cleveland. After the original building burnt down in a fire that destroyed many buildings in Buffalo Creek in 1897, Green contracted Seerie Investment Company to replace the building with fireproof native granite block. The blocks were hoisted into place by six men with a mule team and a gin pole. The building has been in continuous operation as a general store and post office ever since, operated by descendants of the Green family.

== See also ==
- National Register of Historic Places listings in Jefferson County, Colorado
