= Astor House Hotel =

The name Astor House Hotel may refer to:

in China

- Astor House Hotel (Shanghai), a former hotel in Shanghai, China
- The Pujiang Hotel in Shanghai that succeeded the former Astor House Hotel
- Richards' Hotel and Restaurant, a former hotel in Shanghai that preceded the Astor House Hotel

in the United States

- Astor House in New York City, New York, in the United States
- Astor House (Golden, Colorado), also known as Astor House Hotel, listed on the National Register of Historic Places
