= Blue Jay Inn =

- U.S. National Register of Historic Places
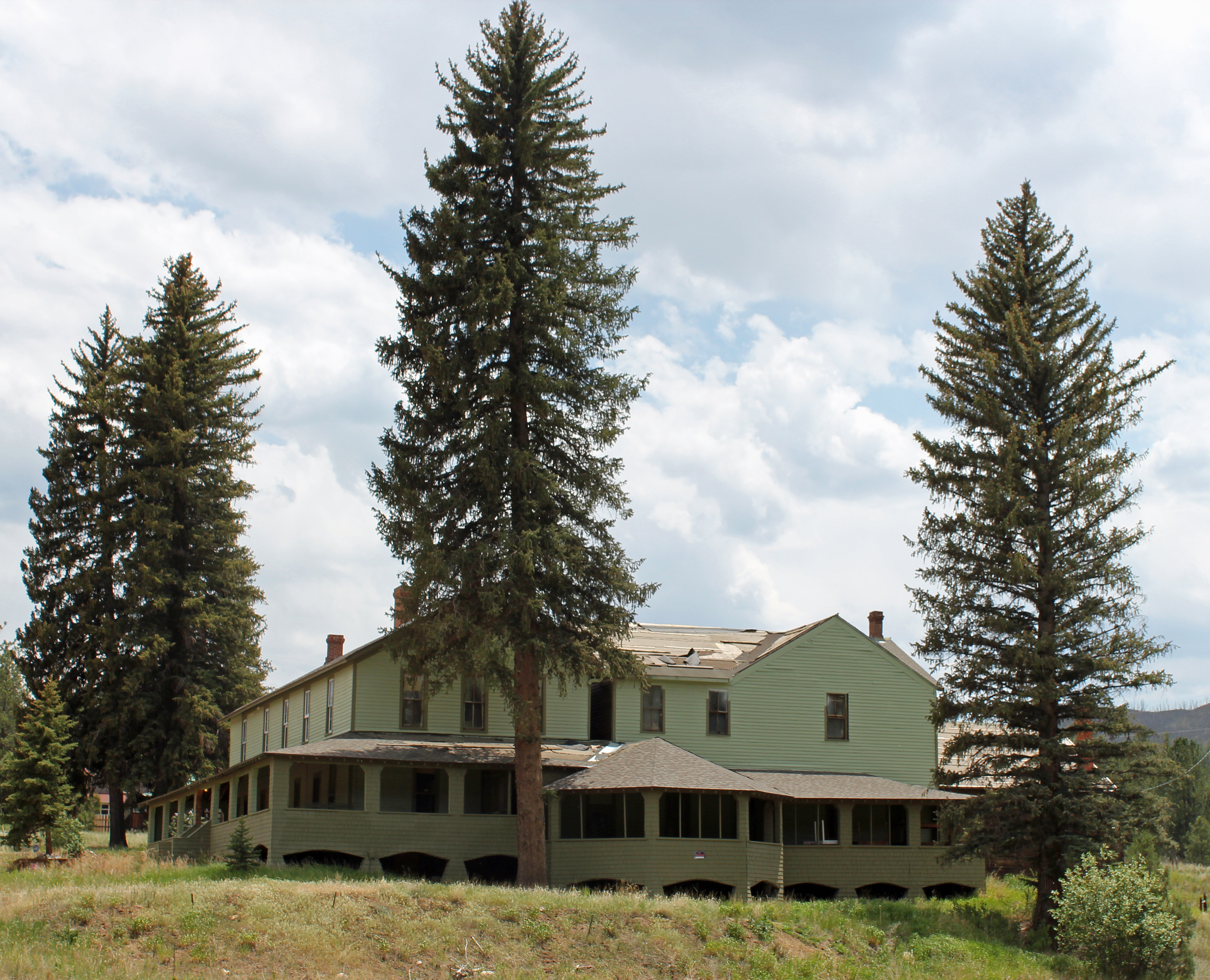
- The inn in Summer, 2013.

- Location within Colorado Location within the United States
- Location: Deckers Rd. (Jefferson CR 126), Buffalo Creek, Colorado
- Coordinates: 39°23′17″N 105°16′23″W
- Area: 3 acres (1.2 ha)
- Built: 1880
- NRHP reference No.: 74000580

The Blue Jay Inn, located in Buffalo Creek, Colorado is a late 1880s building that has served as a boarding house, a girls retreat, and as an inn and a restaurant. On October 1, 1974, it was listed on the National Register of Historic Places.

== History ==
The original structure, then named the Buffalo inn, was built in 1886. The building was renamed The Blue Jay Inn after being purchased by John L. Jerome in 1900 and enlarged with the addition of a second building moved onto the property and set at a 90-degree angle to the original building.

From 1907 through 1947, the Blue Jay Inn was run by Girls' Friendly Society. The inn was purchased in 1947 by Lizzetta Davis and her daughter Katherine, whose family had summered in the area for several years. They reopened the Blue Jay Inn in 1948 and Katherine Davis Ramus kept the dining room and hotel in summer operation until 1998.

The building had minor preservation work done in 2008 following an assessment by Colorado Preservation and being awarded $17,500 by the South Platte Enhancement Board.

== See also ==
- National Register of Historic Places listings in Jefferson County, Colorado
