= Arvada Flour Mill =

- U.S. National Register of Historic Places
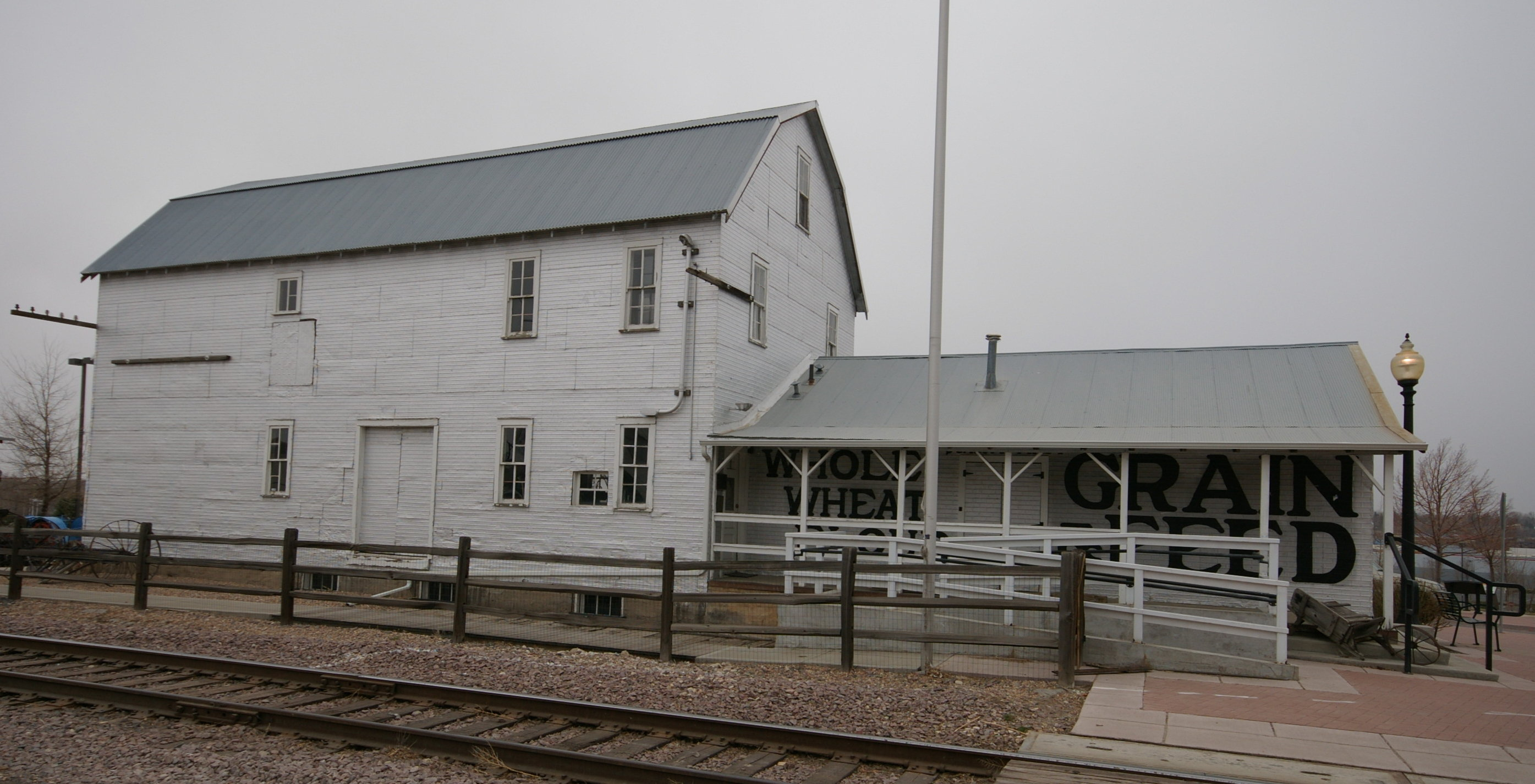

- Location within Colorado Location within the United States
- Location: 5590 Olde Wadsworth Blvd., Arvada, Colorado
- Coordinates: 39°47′54″N 105°4′51″W
- Built: 1923
- Built by: Benjamin, Eugene Emory; Wales, Bert
- NRHP reference No.: 75000521
- Added to NRHP: April 24, 1975

Arvada Flour Mill, also known as Tiller's Moving & Storage, Inc. is a vacant flour mill in Arvada, Colorado, that is or was owned by Tiller's Moving & Storage, Inc. It was listed on the National Register of Historic Places in 1975. The Arvada Historical Society owns the mill and provides tours of the Arvada Flour Mill Museum by appointment.

It is a three-story 50 by 25 feet (15.2 m × 7.6 m) building built in 1923 on a concrete and rock foundation, with a full basement, and with a protruding 23 by 20 feet (7.0 m × 6.1 m) office extension. The machinery in the building was bought from another mill and hence is older.

== See also ==
- National Register of Historic Places listings in Jefferson County, Colorado
