= First Presbyterian Church of Golden and Unger House =

Historic church in Colorado, United States

- First Presbyterian Church of Golden-Unger House
- U.S. National Register of Historic Places
- U.S. Historic district
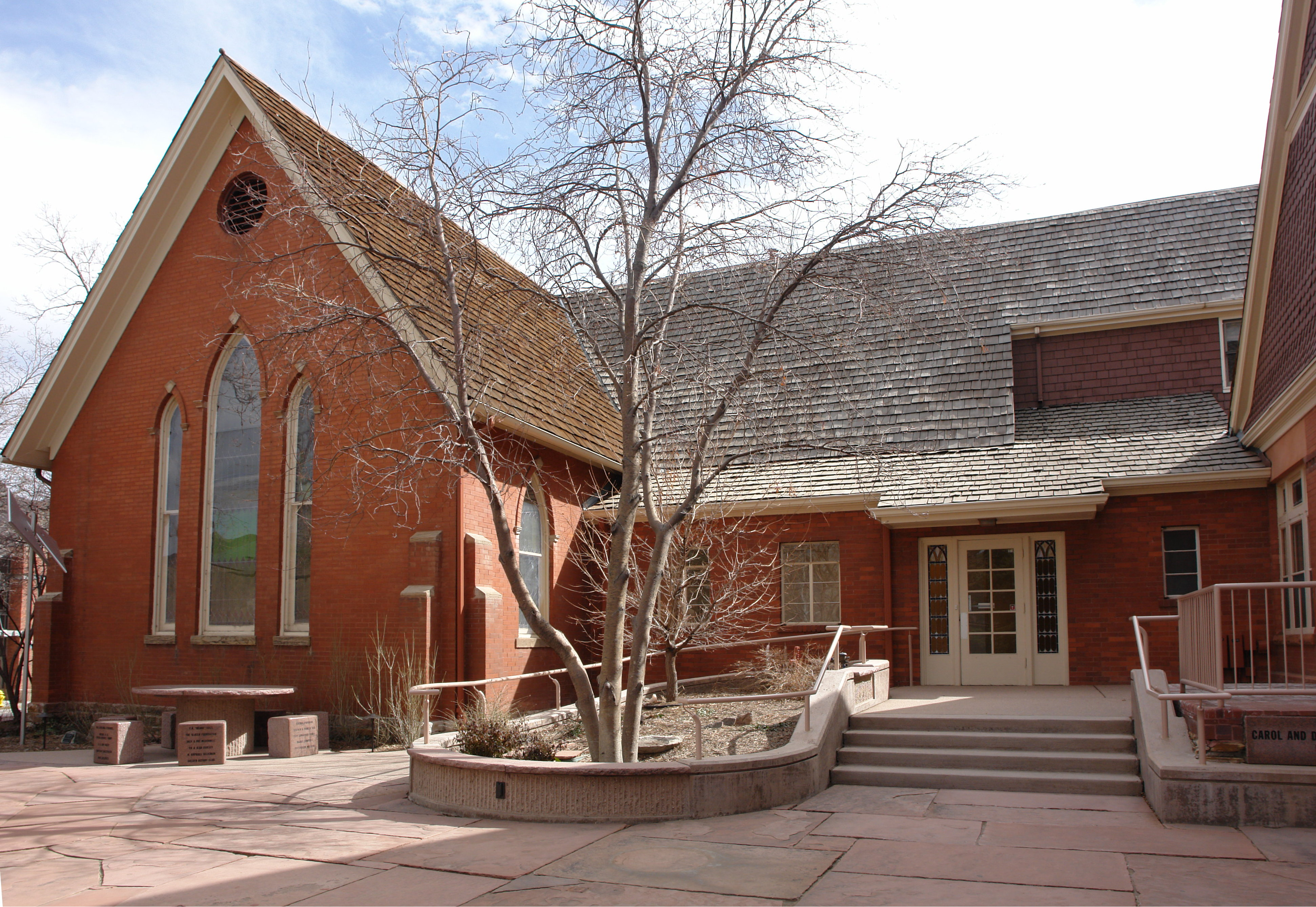

- Location within Colorado Location within the United States
- Location: 809 15th St., Golden, Colorado
- Coordinates: 39°45′09″N 105°13′07″W
- Built: 1872
- Architect: George Kimball; Perre Unger
- Architectural style: Gothic, Queen Anne
- NRHP reference No.: 91000294
- Added to NRHP: March 14, 1991

The First Presbyterian Church of Golden and the Unger House are two buildings in the Foothills Art Center in Golden, Colorado, United States. Together with a manse adjourning the church they were listed on the National Register of Historic Places in 1991, and are the most prominent landmarks of Golden's Court House Hill neighborhood.

== First Presbyterian Church & Manse ==
The main building of the Foothills complex, the historic First Presbyterian Church was originally built in 1872 as the southwesterly portion of the present building. Originally it was a small east–west oriented chapel with Gothic stained glass windows and brick buttresses, for the congregation founded in 1870 by the famed circuit riding minister Sheldon Jackson. The church was built on land donated by William A.H. Loveland. In 1898 the growing congregation hired prominent area architect James H. Gow to redesign and add onto the building, which transformed it into a roughly cross-shaped chapel with northeast corner bell tower, with smooth new facing brick enabling the whole to match. The place continued serving as the First Presbyterian Church until the congregation outgrew this space and moved to south Golden in 1958. The fledgling Jefferson Unitarian Church, led by C. Leon Hopper, then took over the church building, and worshipped here for 10 years until moving to their own home east of Golden in Applewood in 1968. By that time, Golden sidewalk art sales were calling attention to the need for an area art center of its own, which led to the creation of the Foothills Art Center, which took over the already artistic space. It has since become one of the renowned art exhibition places of Colorado.

The Manse of the complex is the northwest wing of the Foothills gallery complex. It was built freestanding in 1892 as the home for the minister of the First Presbyterian Church. It is a Queen Anne-styled home with upper story fishscale siding and onion dome tower. Through additions added in 1898, 1920 and 1947 the main church was linked to this building. It now serves as the main entrance and gift shop of the Foothills Art Center.

== Unger House ==
The Unger House, also historically known as the Rubey House, is a brick house which stands south of the First Presbyterian Church building on Washington Avenue. It was originally designed and built in 1899 by prominent Golden builder Perre O. Unger. It is Edwardian style, featuring a northeast corner tower and ornamental front porch. Built as a speculation, it was sold in 1900 to banker Jesse W. Rubey as a home for family matriarch Ella M. Rubey. Around 1990 the home was purchased by the Foothills Art Center and now serves as their offices.

== See also ==
- National Register of Historic Places listings in Jefferson County, Colorado
