= Barnes–Peery House =

Historic house in Colorado, United States

- U.S. National Register of Historic Places
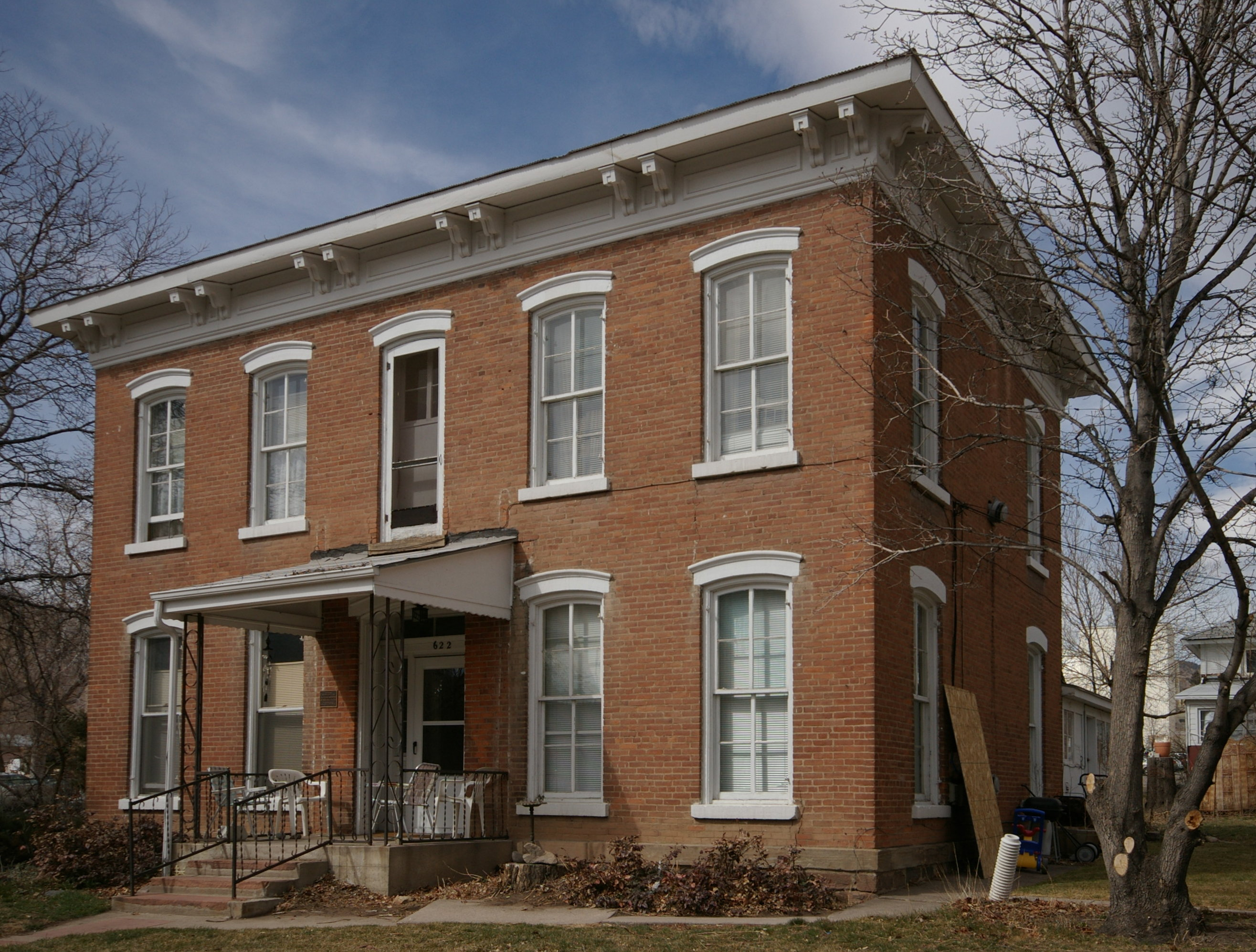
- Barnes Mansion

- Location within Colorado Location within the United States
- Location: 622 Water St., Golden, Colorado
- Coordinates: 39°45′29″N 105°13′16″W
- Area: less than one acre
- Built: 1865
- Architectural style: Italianate
- NRHP reference No.: 01001105
- Added to NRHP: October 12, 2001

The Barnes–Peery House, known commonly as the Barnes Mansion, is one of the oldest private homes of Jefferson County, Colorado, USA. It was built in 1865 by David Marcus Barnes, the first flour miller in Jefferson County, who had just moved his flouring mill (a business still operating today as the Golden Mill) to Golden after establishing it on Bear Creek to the south the year before. The Barnes home was the first major brick house in Jefferson County, and is designed in Italianate style, featuring rows of stone arched windows. A rear carriage house was built in 1871. While living here Barnes founded Loveland, Colorado, in 1873. After surviving a fire that destroyed its roof in 1875, the home went on to house other owners of the flour mill, including the Peery family who operated the business for much of the 20th century.

It was listed on the National Register of Historic Places in 2001.

== See also ==
- National Register of Historic Places listings in Jefferson County, Colorado
