= Aspen Park, Colorado =

Census-designated place in Jefferson County, Colorado, United States

- Census-designated place
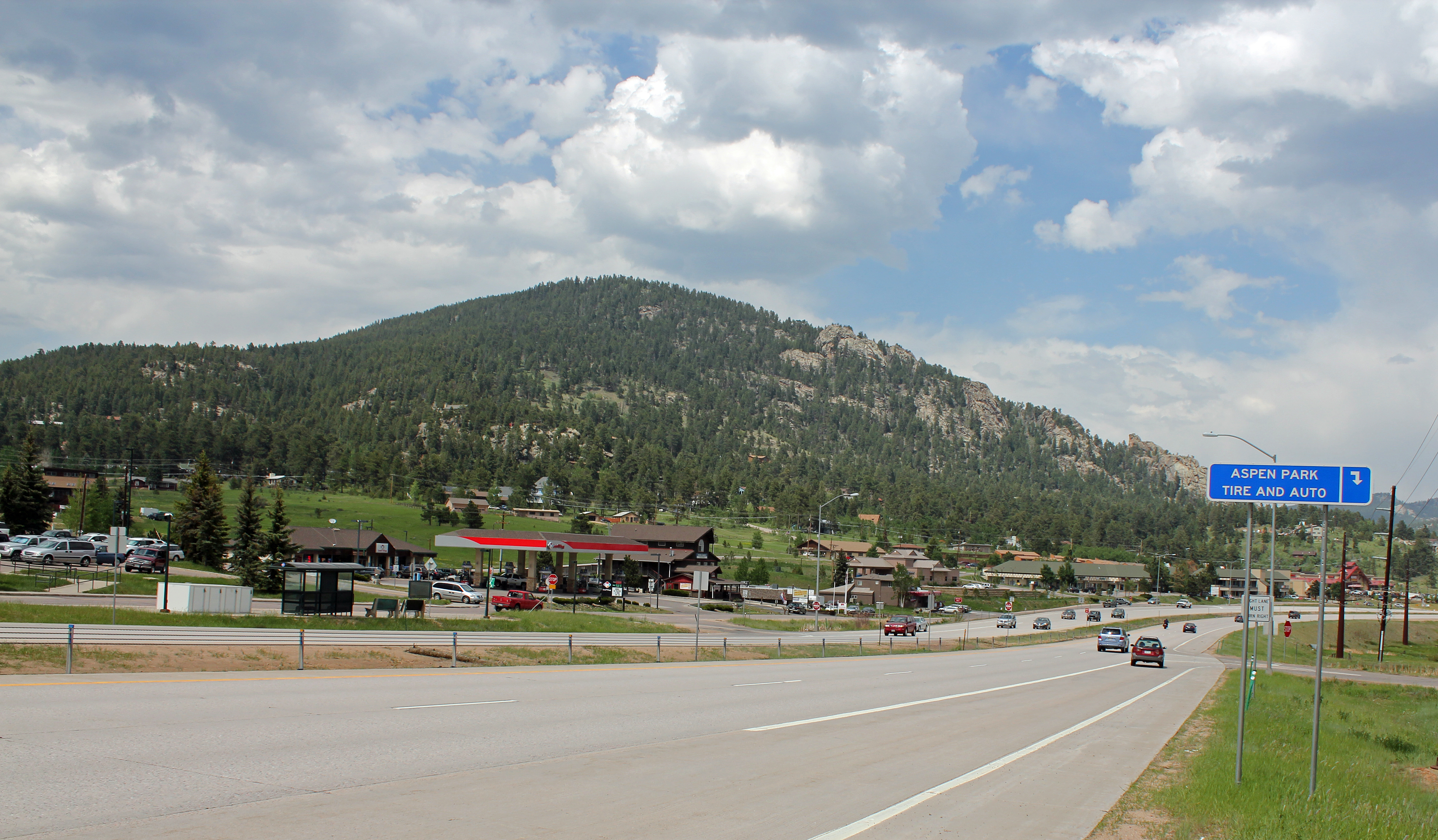
- Aspen Park in 2013

- Location of the Aspen Park CDP in Jefferson County, Colorado
- Coordinates: 39°32′32″N 105°17′48″W
- Country: United States
- State: Colorado
- County: Jefferson

Government
  - Type: unincorporated community
  - Body: Jefferson County

Area
  - Total: 2.486 sq mi (6.438 km^{2})
  - Land: 2.492 sq mi (6.455 km^{2})
  - Water: 0.0066 sq mi (0.017 km^{2})
- Elevation: 8,091 ft (2,466 m)

Population (2020)
  - Total: 810
  - Density: 330/sq mi (130/km^{2})
- Time zone: UTC−07:00 (MST)
  - Summer (DST): UTC−06:00 (MDT)
- ZIP Code: Conifer 80433
- Area codes: 303/720/983
- GNIS CDP ID: 2407775
- FIPS code: 08-03730

Aspen Park is an unincorporated community and a census-designated place (CDP) located in Jefferson County, Colorado, United States. The CDP is a part of the Denver–Aurora–Lakewood, CO Metropolitan Statistical Area. The population of the Aspen Park CDP was 810 at the United States Census 2020. The Aspen Park Metropolitan District provides services. The Conifer post office (ZIP Code 80433) serves the area.

== Geography ==
Aspen Park is located in southern Jefferson County. U.S. Route 285 passes through the community, leading northeast 25 miles (40 km) to Englewood and southwest 55 miles (89 km) to Fairplay. Downtown Denver is 30 miles (48 km) northeast of Aspen Park. The community sits at the headwaters of South Turkey Creek, and the western edge of the CDP follows the course of North Turkey Creek. The two creeks are part of the South Platte River watershed.

At the 2020 United States census, the Aspen Park CDP had an area of 1,595 acres (6.455 km^{2}), including 4.2 acres (0.017 km^{2}) of water.

== Demographics ==
The United States Census Bureau initially defined the Aspen Park CDP for the United States Census 2000.

Aspen Park CDP, Colorado
Year	Pop.	±%
2000	874	—
2010	882	+0.9%
2020	810	−8.2%
Source: United States Census Bureau

== Education ==
Aspen Park is served by the Jefferson County Public Schools.

== See also ==
- Front Range Urban Corridor
- Midway House (Aspen Park, Colorado)
