= Pioneer Sod House =

Historic house in Colorado, United States

- U.S. National Register of Historic Places
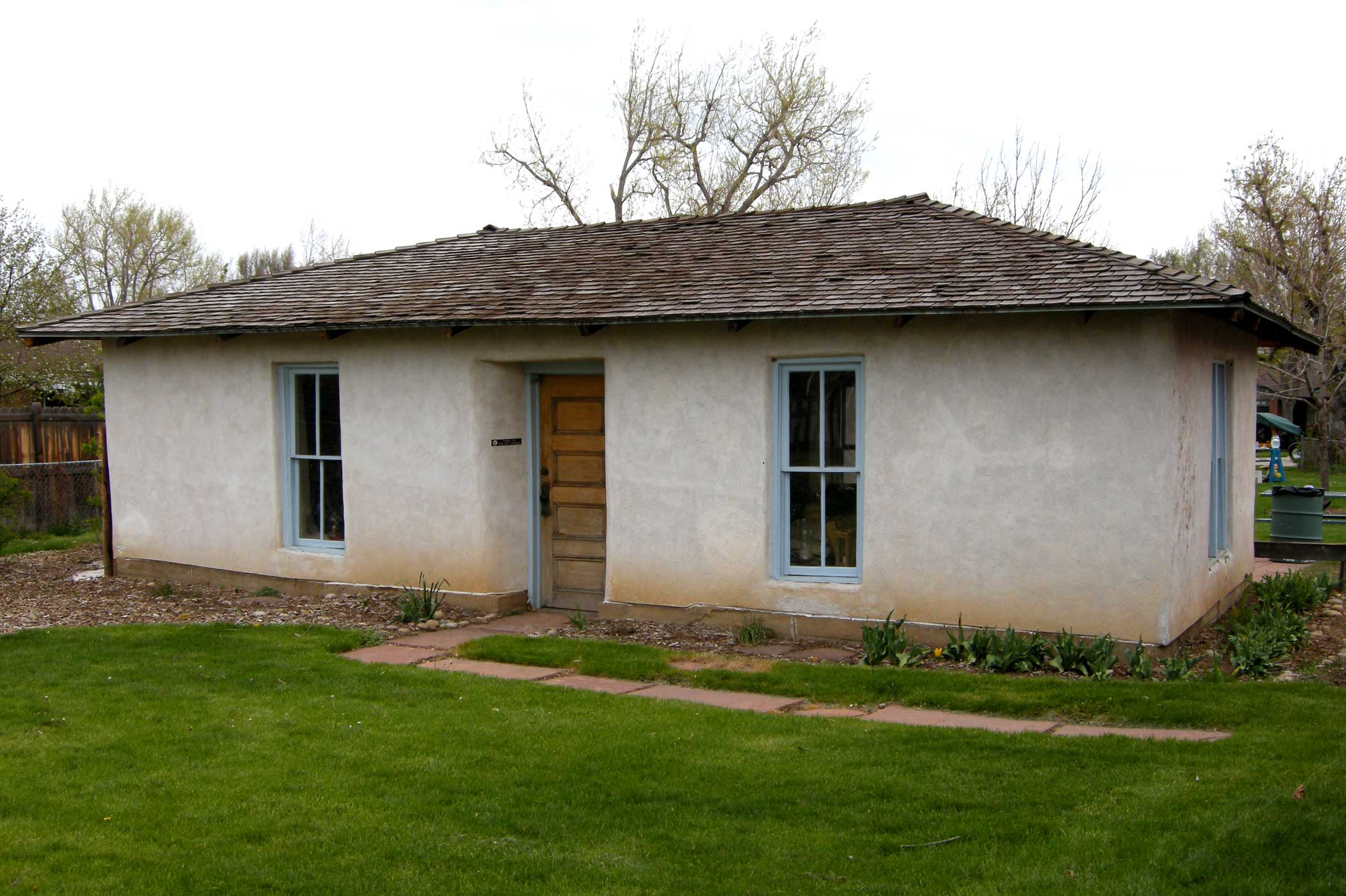

- Location within Colorado Location within the United States
- Location: 4610 Robb St., Wheat Ridge, Colorado
- Coordinates: 39°46′51″N 105°7′30″W
- Area: 0.2 acres (0.081 ha)
- Built: 1886
- NRHP reference No.: 73000479
- Added to NRHP: March 14, 1973

The Pioneer Sod House, now known as the Wheat Ridge Museum and Sod House in Wheat Ridge, Colorado is a sod house built in 1886 or perhaps well before. It was listed on the National Register of Historic Places in 1973.

In 1976, the Blue Spruce Chapter of the Daughters of the American Revolution installed a marker "in commemoration of the Bicentennial" and planted a mature Blue Spruce Tree near the sod house.

== History ==
=== Construction ===
Pioneers began to settle in present-day Wheat Ridge in 1859. James H. Baugh, who had come to Colorado Territory from the plains, chose to build a house with prairie grass and sod, based upon his experience. (Note: Baugh homesteaded 160 acres in the area of 44th Avenue and Robb Street. The National Register of Historic Places listed a log cabin, built in 1859, that Baugh built at 44th and Robb. Like the sod house, the land around the log cabin was also irrigated for orchard trees and crops. The nomination form states that the sod building at the Wheat Ridge Historical Park may have been built by the same James Baugh between 1863 and 1870.) The house was well-insulated against the cold winter and hot summer weather. In the 1860s, Baugh and Jacob Brown created irrigation ditches for farming.

The 30 inches (76 cm) walls of the house were built of native prairie grass and sod, held in place by hog wire. The L-shaped house, built 31-feet wide by 31 feet long, has three rooms with plastered and wallpapered walls. Originally the house had wooden floors, but in 1938 the floors were covered in cement. The exterior walls are stuccoed with chicken wire and plaster.

Sod houses were rare in the Denver area, as lumber was available, and this is likely the only one surviving.

=== Land grant ===
When Baugh settled in the Clear Creek Valley, there were no land offices or procedures for purchasing land. He squatted on the land until 1867. On October 1, 1867, President Andrew Johnson awarded a bounty of land in Colorado to New Mexico Volunteer veterans who fought against Navajo people during the Navajo Wars. Veteran Polomia Garcia Y Padilla received the land grant and signed his land rights to Baugh after he was paid $500 (equivalent to $11,518 in 2025) for the land.

=== Age ===
While the nomination for the National Register of Historic places asserts it was built in 1886, the house is believed by the Wheat Ridge Historical Society to have been built before 1864. James H. Baugh purchased the land that his sod house stood on in 1867.

It was more or less continuously occupied as a residence from 1886 to the summer of 1972.

=== Subsequent owners ===
Bert White moved onto the property in the early 1900s with his family of 13. In 1910, White built a five-room brick house for most of the family and his boys lived in the sod house. He farmed the land, experimenting with varieties of fruits and vegetables for the Agricultural College in Fort Collins, later Colorado State University.

The Whites grew Pascal celery, asparagus, beets, carrots, parsnips, lettuce, and green beans. The Whites cultivated fruit, including white grapes, raspberries, gooseberries, and dew berries.

Bert and his wife Etta lived in the brick house until 1933 when they died. Their son Frank lived in the sod house and another building with six of his twelve children. The Whites sold the property in 1939. Three families owned the property after the Whites and until 1970s.

=== 1863 log cabin ===
A log cabin that was previously located at Johnson Park was relocated to the site of the sod house at the Wheat Ridge Historical Park. It was Colorado Territory's first registered homestead, built at 48th Avenue and Teller Street.

== Museum ==
The interior of the sod house is decorated as it may have appeared in the late 1800s. The building is used by the Wheat Ridge Historical Society, who hold events like Cider Days and the May Festival.

== See also ==
- National Register of Historic Places listings in Jefferson County, Colorado
