= Astor House (Golden, Colorado) =

- Astor House Hotel
- U.S. National Register of Historic Places
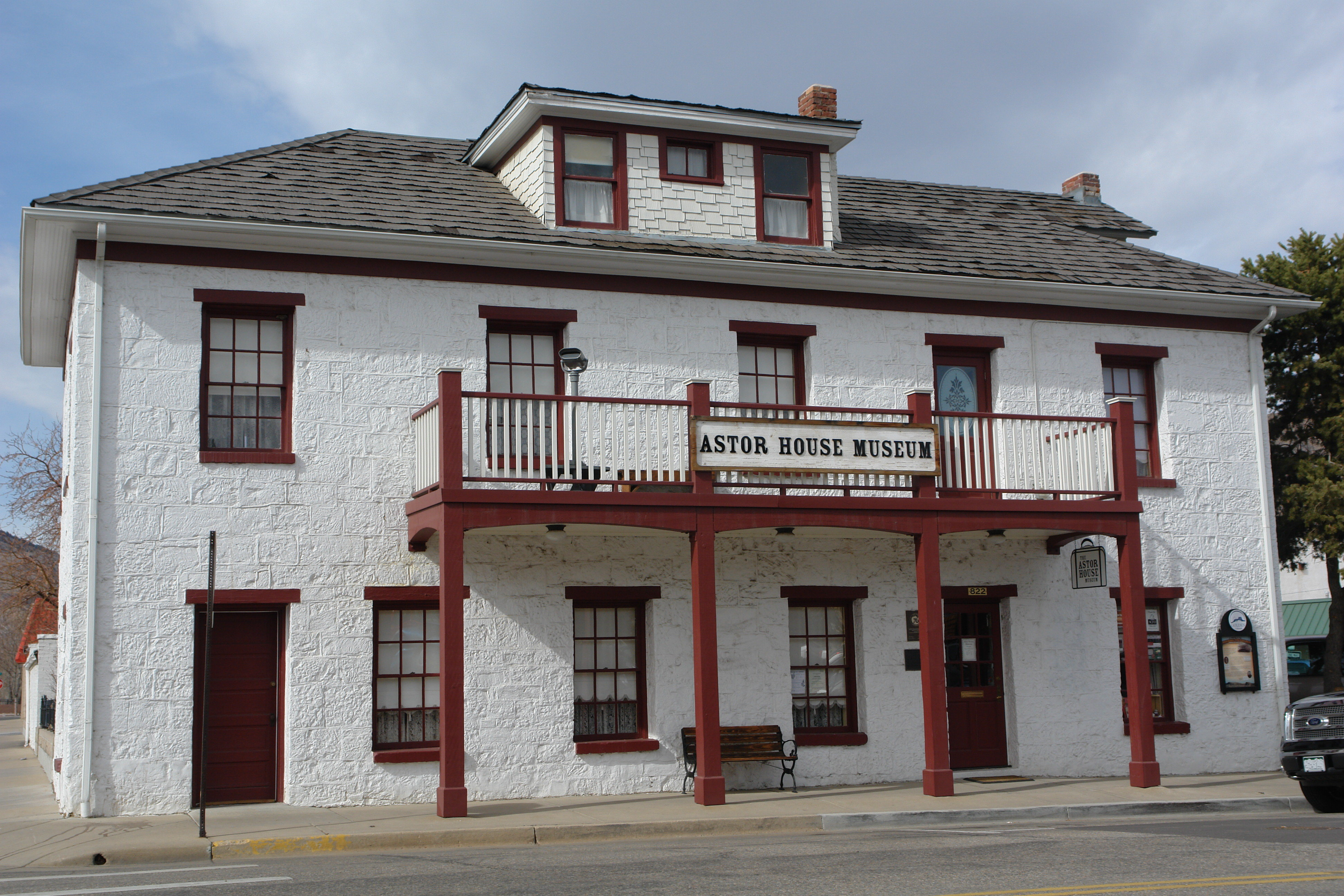

- Location within Colorado Location within the United States
- Location: 822 12th St, Golden, Colorado
- Coordinates: 39°45′19.33″N 105°13′17.61″W
- Area: 0.5 acres (0.20 ha)
- Built: 1867
- Built by: Ernst Osterberg
- Architectural style: Georgian (modified)
- NRHP reference No.: 73000478
- Added to NRHP: March 1, 1973

The Astor House, at 822 12th St. in Golden, Colorado, is a historic stone hotel from the earliest years of Golden, Colorado, United States. It was built in 1867. It has also been known as the Astor House Hotel, Castle Rock House, Hotel Boston and the Astor House Hotel Museum.

Associated with prominent area pioneers, it was also a pioneering effort in historic preservation in the region in 1972. It was the second site of Jefferson County, Colorado listed on the National Register of Historic Places, in 1973.

It is a two-story building built from hand-cut sandstone.

== History ==
The Astor House was originally built in 1867 by Seth Lake, a pioneer hotelkeeper who came to the area in 1860 and had owned and operated the Green Mountain House at East Pleasant View, Colorado, Buckeye Hotel at Apex, and Two Mile House in Golden Gate Canyon. An upgrade from his original Lake House hotel on the site, it was carved of sandstone quarried by Charles R. Foreman & Co. at the far west end of 12th Street, upon which the hotel stands. The hotel was constructed by Ernst Osterberg. The premier hostelry of Golden, it served patrons from miners to Territorial legislators and Supreme Court officials, who met nearby in the Loveland Block and Coors Building. Run by Seth and Charlotte Lake into their 70s, the Astor House was Golden's only known hotel not to have served alcohol, as the devout Baptist deacon Seth was a temperance man who would not allow it on his premises. Later, the hotel was owned by German immigrant Ida Goetze. It gradually faded from hotel to boarding house, and was altered by four fires and repaired to its present appearance.

== Preservation ==
In 1971, the property was acquired by the Golden Downtown Improvement District to be destroyed for a parking lot, a fate befalling a number of Golden's landmarks, including the church Lake had faithfully served. City Councilor Ruben Hartmeister raised concerns about whether a place of its history should be preserved. Standing alone, he was not initially listened to, but Golden's modern historic preservation movement was born. Citizens rallied to the aid of the Astor House and formed the Golden Landmarks Association to try to save it. On June 13, 1972, Golden's people voted to save it, with 69% voting in favor. Afterward, it became the Astor House Hotel Museum, depicting life in the hotel, Golden and Colorado in the late 19th and early 20th Centuries.

== See also ==
- National Register of Historic Places listings in Jefferson County, Colorado
