= Conifer, Colorado =

Unincorporated community in Colorado, US

- Unincorporated community
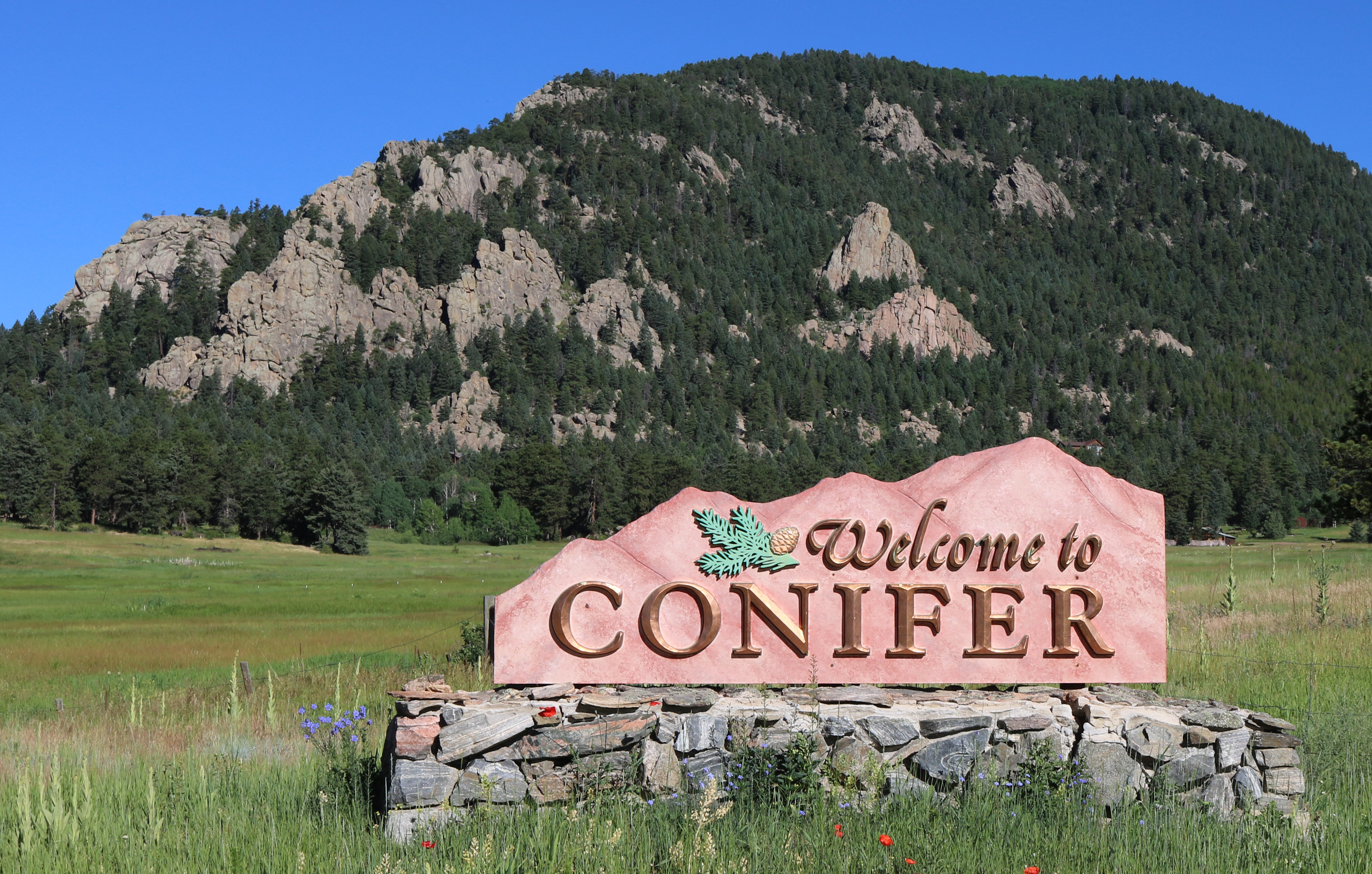
- Sign along Highway 285

- Location of Conifer, Colorado. Conifer (Colorado)
- Coordinates: 39°31′16″N 105°18′19″W
- Country: United States
- State: Colorado
- County: Jefferson
- Settled: 1860s

Government
  - Type: Unincorporated community
  - Body: Jefferson County
- Elevation: 8,262 ft (2,518 m)

Population (2009)
  - Total: 19,683
- Time zone: UTC−07:00 (MST)
  - Summer (DST): UTC−06:00 (MDT)
- ZIP code: 80433
- Area codes: 303/720/983
- GNIS populated place ID: 204717
- Website: Conifer CoC

Conifer is an unincorporated community in Jefferson County, Colorado, United States. Conifer is located along U.S. Route 285 in the foothills west of Denver.

== History ==
The Conifer, Colorado, post office operated from November 16, 1894, until February 28, 1929. A new Conifer, Colorado, post office opened on October 1, 1960. Some say the community was named after George Conifer, the proprietor of a local tavern, while others believe conifer trees near the original town site caused the name to be selected. It is possible that George Conifer was merely a byname, or even that he never existed, as no person with this surname appears in the census.

== Geography ==
A magnitude 2.8 tremor centered about 1.4 miles (2.3 km) south of Aspen Park occurred on November 1, 1981, at 8:03 p.m. MST.

=== Climate ===
Conifer has a humid continental climate (Koppen: Dfb) with a yearly temperature average of 38.6 °F (3.7 °C). Summertime is warm with cool nights, while winter is chilly with nights approaching zero.

Climate data for Conifer, Colorado
Month	Jan	Feb	Mar	Apr	May	Jun	Jul	Aug	Sep	Oct	Nov	Dec	Year
Record high °F (°C)	65 (18)	70 (21)	72 (22)	78 (26)	86 (30)	95 (35)	95 (35)	93 (34)	91 (33)	83 (28)	72 (22)	66 (19)	95 (35)
Mean daily maximum °F (°C)	38 (3)	41 (5)	46 (8)	53 (12)	62 (17)	73 (23)	78 (26)	76 (24)	69 (21)	59 (15)	45 (7)	38 (3)	57 (14)
Mean daily minimum °F (°C)	7 (−14)	10 (−12)	17 (−8)	23 (−5)	31 (−1)	38 (3)	43 (6)	42 (6)	34 (1)	24 (−4)	15 (−9)	9 (−13)	24 (−4)
Record low °F (°C)	−46 (−43)	−48 (−44)	−25 (−32)	−15 (−26)	6 (−14)	22 (−6)	28 (−2)	26 (−3)	7 (−14)	−9 (−23)	−26 (−32)	−33 (−36)	−48 (−44)
Average precipitation inches (mm)	0.40 (10)	0.54 (14)	1.28 (33)	1.92 (49)	2.10 (53)	1.76 (45)	2.55 (65)	2.68 (68)	1.25 (32)	1.15 (29)	0.89 (23)	0.58 (15)	17.1 (436)
Average snowfall inches (cm)	14 (36)	11.3 (29)	7.2 (18)	2.5 (6.4)	0.6 (1.5)	0.1 (0.25)	0 (0)	0 (0)	0.2 (0.51)	1.7 (4.3)	8.3 (21)	17.6 (45)	63.5 (161.96)
Source: Weather Underground

== Landmarks ==
- The Clifton House Inn, Jefferson County Register of Historic Places
- Conifer Junction Schoolhouse, National Register of Historic Places
- The Conley Coffee Shop, Jefferson County Register of Historic Places
- The Lubin-Blakeslee Place at Meyer Ranch, Conifer, Jefferson County Register of Historic Places
- Midway House at Meyers Ranch, built 1889, National Register of Historic Places 5JF.303
- Original Elk Creek Fire House, Jefferson County Register of Historic Places
- Pleasant Park School, built 1894, Colorado Register of Historic Places 5JF.972
- Yellow Barn at Bradford Junction, built 1918, Jefferson County Register of Historic Places
- Coney Island Hot Dog Stand for many years it was in Aspen Park area of Conifer, but was moved to the nearby community of Bailey.
- Staunton State Park - 3,908-acre (1,582 ha) state park located 6 miles west of Conifer

== Education ==
Students living within Jefferson County attend Jefferson County schools. Those neighborhood schools are Elk Creek Elementary School, West Jefferson Elementary School, Marshdale Elementary School, West Jefferson Middle School, and Conifer High School. In 2011, Conifer High School was ranked 434 in the top 500 schools in the nation by Newsweek.

== Infrastructure ==
Conifer residents are served by the Elk Creek Fire Protection District, a mixed career/volunteer fire department with approximately 60 active-duty firefighters.

US Route 285 is alongside The Town.

== Notable people ==
- Brandon Barnes, drummer for the band Rise Against and animal activist
- Amy Bruckner, actress, attorney, and singer
- Trey Parker, co-creator of South Park and The Book of Mormon musical
- Blaine Sumner, powerlifter
- Sarah Thomas, marathon swimmer

== See also ==
- Front Range Urban Corridor
