= Camp George West Historic District =

Historic district in Colorado, United States

- U.S. National Register of Historic Places
- U.S. Historic district
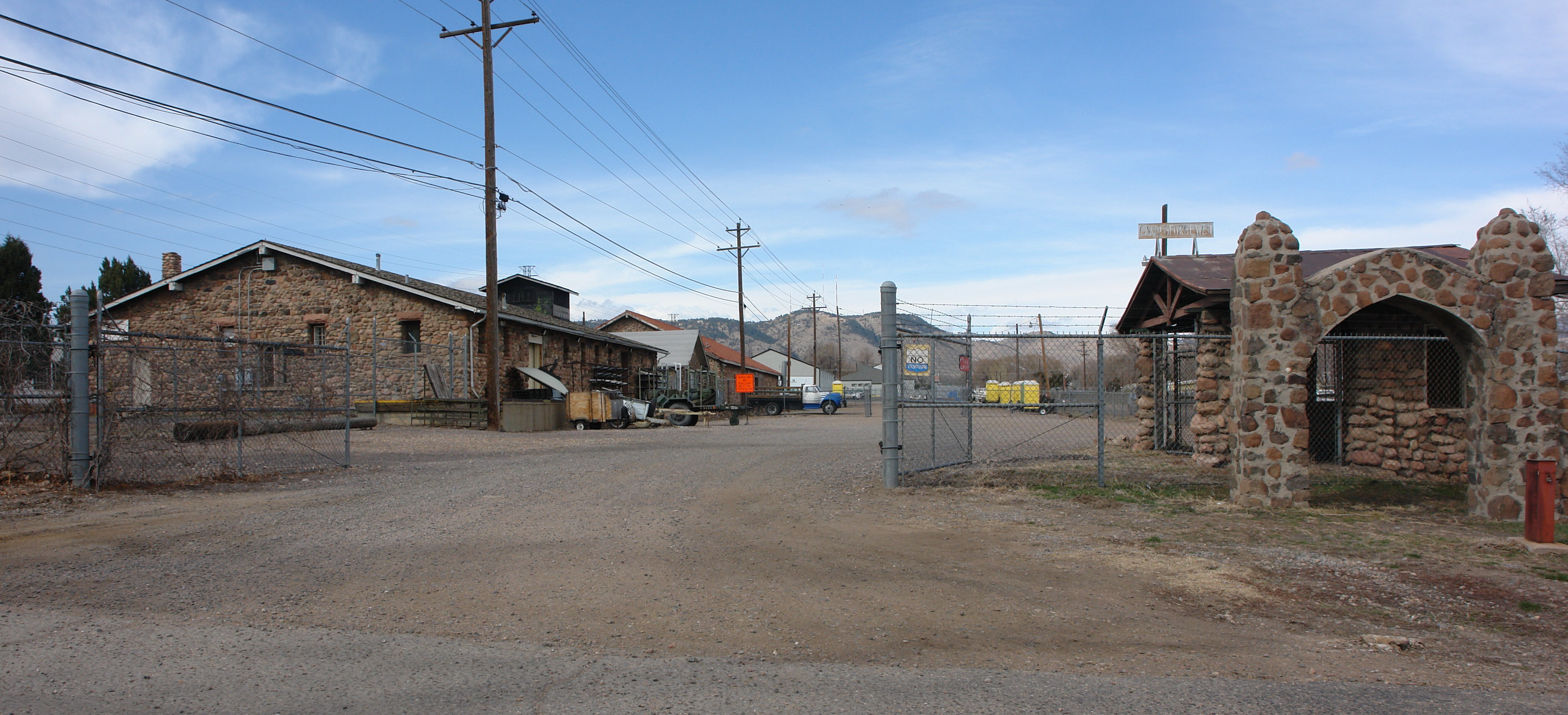

- Location within Colorado Location within the United States
- Nearest city: 15000 S. Golden Rd., Golden, Colorado
- Coordinates: 39°44′12″N 105°10′20″W
- Built: 1903
- Architect: George H. Merchant, Albert Bryan
- Architectural style: Bungalow/Craftsman
- MPS: Camp George West MPS
- NRHP reference No.: 92001865
- Added to NRHP: February 11, 1993

Camp George West Historic District or Camp George West (also known as State Rifle Range;5JF145) was a military base for the Colorado National Guard, located at 15000 S. Golden Rd., Golden, Colorado. It was used as a rifle range, while artillery practice took place on Green Mountain, on the north side of present-day Hayden Park near Lakewood, Colorado. The Department of Defense Military Munitions Response Program has financed investigations to identify unexploded ordnance there since 2012.

Camp George West is now used as a correctional facility, police training academy, and emergency operations center. It contains an Ammunition Igloo, a bunker used for arms storage, and Colorado Amphitheater, both of which are vacant.

The historic district was listed on the National Register of Historic Places in 1993, with the Ammunition Igloo and the Amphitheater listed separately.

== See also ==
- National Register of Historic Places listings in Jefferson County, Colorado
