= Colorado Amphitheater =

- U.S. National Register of Historic Places
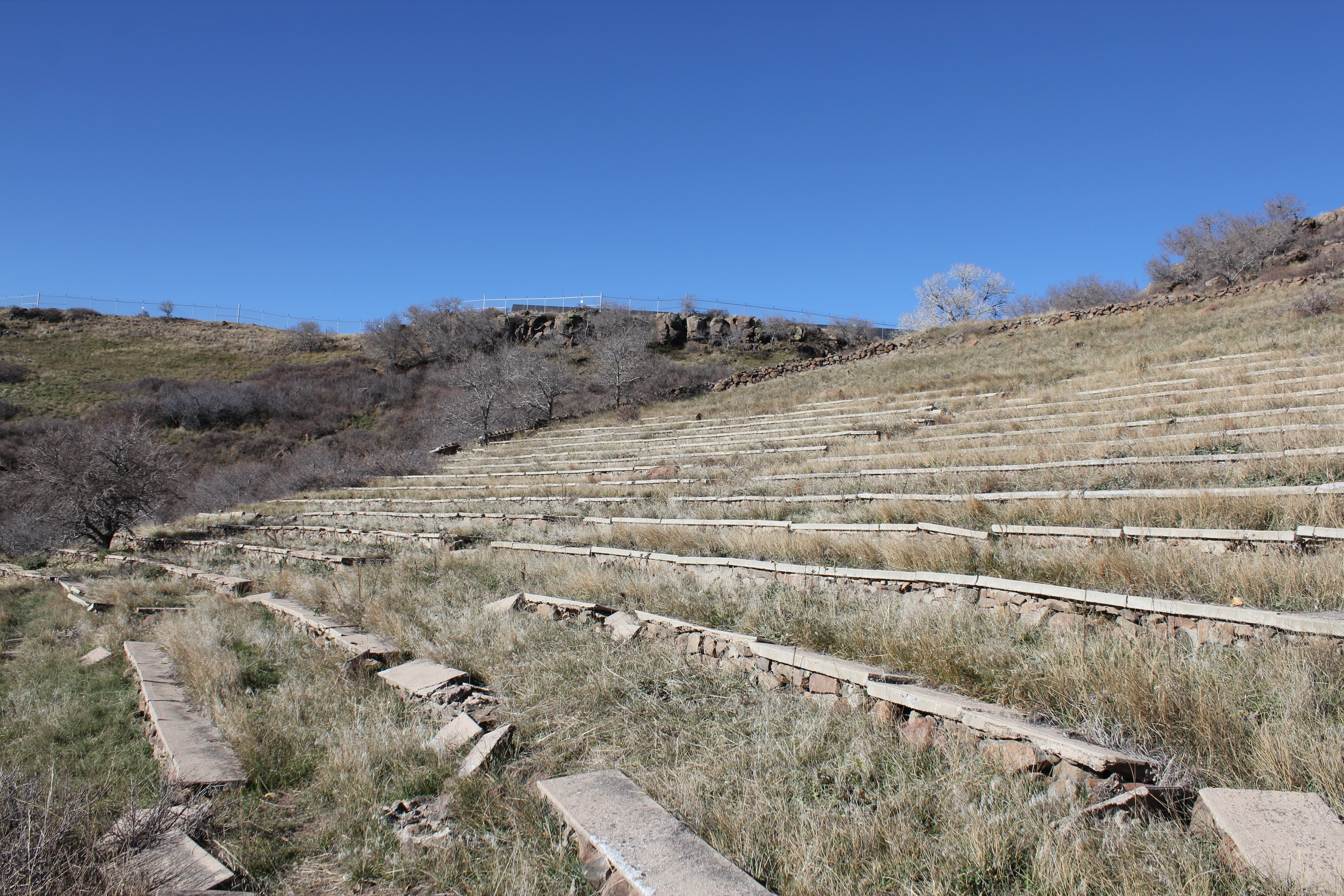
- The site in 2013.

- Location within Colorado Location within the United States
- Location: 15001 Denver W. Pkwy., Golden, Colorado
- Coordinates: 39°44′36″N 105°10′33″W
- Built: 1935
- Built by: Works Progress Administration
- Architect: Ardourel, Frank J.
- MPS: Camp George West MPS
- NRHP reference No.: 93000378
- Added to NRHP: May 20, 1993

The Colorado Amphitheater (Zypher Amphitheater), also known as Structure #41, is a natural stone amphitheater built in 1935 to serve Camp George West of the Colorado National Guard. It is located near the base of South Table Mountain, a mesa located just east of Golden, Colorado.

Built under the auspices of commander Neil West Kimball, grandson of the general for whom the camp was named, it was constructed as a project of the Works Progress Administration. One of its primary uses in operation was to show films to the Guard troops. However, the amphitheater fell into disuse when rattlesnakes became too plentiful for comfort. The amphitheater later came into ownership by the National Renewable Energy Laboratory.

It was listed on the National Register of Historic Places in 1993.

== See also ==
- National Register of Historic Places listings in Jefferson County, Colorado
