= Hildebrand Ranch =

- U.S. National Register of Historic Places
- U.S. Historic district
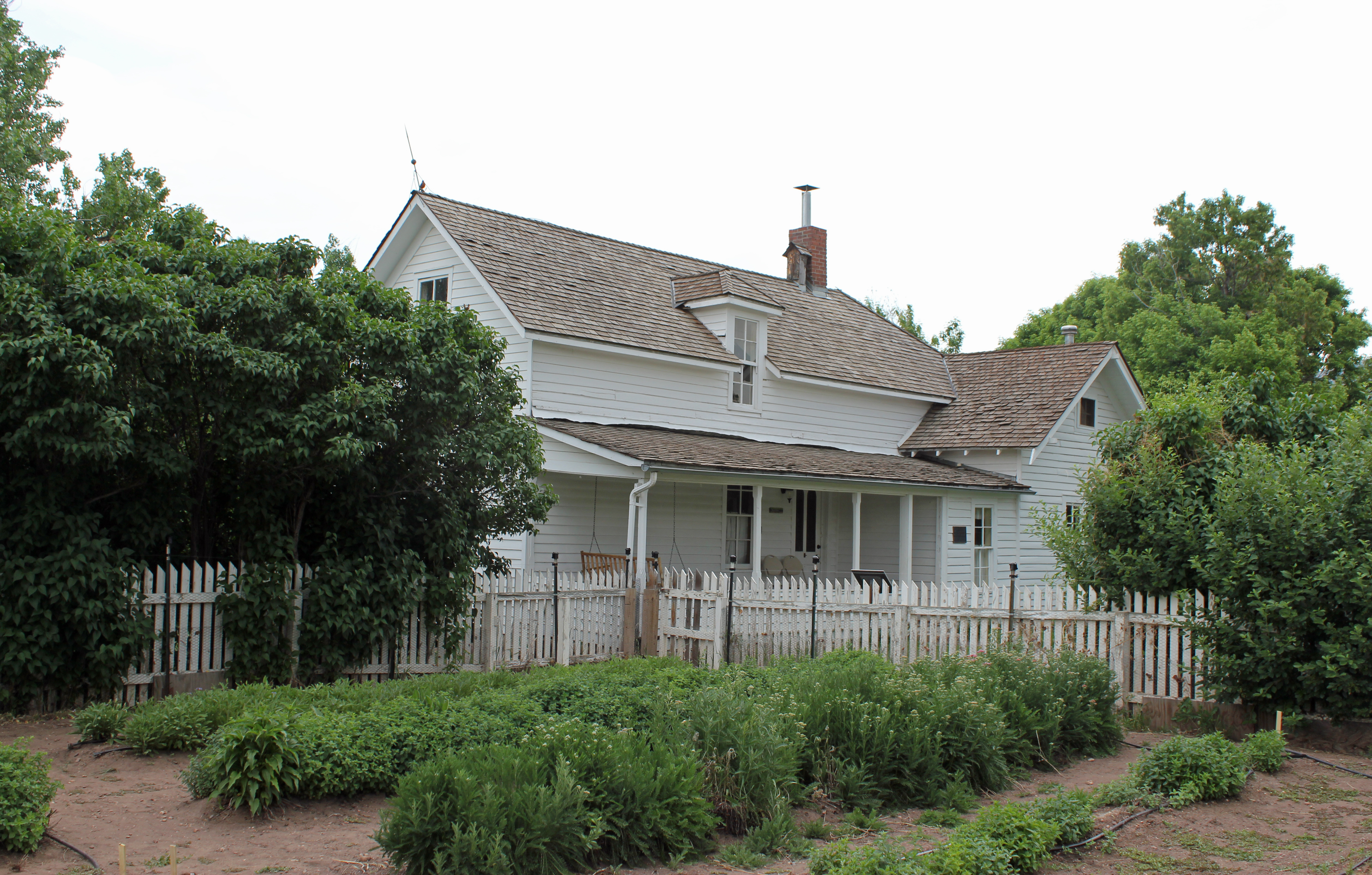
- The ranch house in summer 2013.

- Location within Colorado Location within the United States
- Nearest city: Littleton, Colorado
- Coordinates: 39°33′05″N 105°06′03″W
- Area: 5 acres (2.0 ha)
- Built: 1866
- NRHP reference No.: 75000524
- Added to NRHP: March 13, 1975

Hildebrand Ranch is located near Littleton, Colorado. In 1866 Frank and Elizabeth Hildebrand settled in Deer Creek and homesteaded on 160 acres. In the 1950s there was a plan that was authorized to control flooding in Denver but the funds never came. In 1971 the Army condemned 333.73 acres of the ranch and created Chatfield Reservoir. In March 1973 Denver leased 750 acres from Chatfield and 67 for the Denver Botanic Gardens which included the ranch's original buildings. In February 2001 Jefferson County Open Space purchased 1,450 acres of Hildebrand Ranch

== See also ==
- National Register of Historic Places listings in Jefferson County, Colorado
