= East Pleasant View, Colorado =

Census-designated place in Jefferson County, Colorado, United States

- Census-designated place
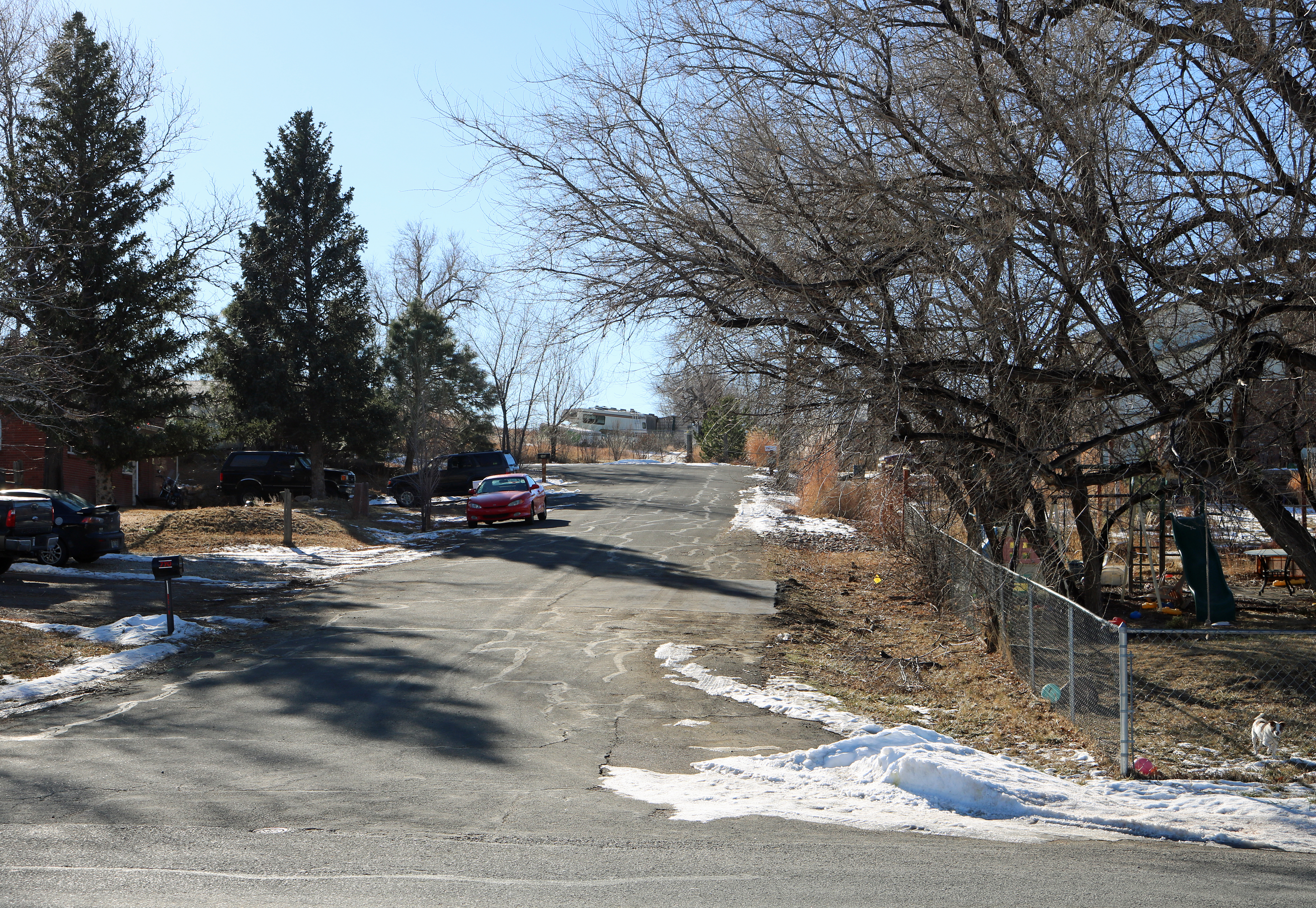
- Ellis Street in East Pleasant View.

- Location of the East Pleasant View CDP in Jefferson County, Colorado
- Coordinates: 39°43′40″N 105°09′26″W
- Country: United States
- State: Colorado
- County: Jefferson

Government
  - Type: unincorporated community
  - Body: Jefferson County

Area
  - Total: 0.111 sq mi (0.287 km^{2})
  - Land: 0.111 sq mi (0.287 km^{2})
  - Water: 0 sq mi (0.000 km^{2})
- Elevation: 5,837 ft (1,779 m)

Population (2020)
  - Total: 333
  - Density: 3,010/sq mi (1,160/km^{2})
- Time zone: UTC−07:00 (MST)
  - Summer (DST): UTC−06:00 (MDT)
- ZIP code: Golden 80401
- Area codes: 303/720/983
- GNIS CDP ID: 2408030
- FIPS code: 08-22575

East Pleasant View is an unincorporated community and a census-designated place (CDP) located in and governed by Jefferson County, Colorado, United States. The CDP is a part of the Denver-Aurora-Centennial, CO Metropolitan Statistical Area. The population of the East Pleasant View CDP was 333 at the United States Census 2020. The Pleasant View Metropolitan District provides services. The Golden Post Office (ZIP Code 80401) serves the area.

== Geography ==
At the 2020 United States Census, the East Pleasant View CDP had an area of 71 acres (0.287 km^{2}), all land.

== Demographics ==
The United States Census Bureau initially defined the East Pleasant View CDP for the United States Census 2000.

East Pleasant View CDP, Colorado
Year	Pop.	±%
2000	369	—
2010	356	−3.5%
2020	333	−6.5%
Source: United States Census Bureau

== Education ==
East Pleasant View is served by the Jefferson County Public Schools.

== See also ==
- Front Range Urban Corridor
