= Midway House (Aspen Park, Colorado) =

Historic house in Colorado, United States

- U.S. National Register of Historic Places
- U.S. Historic district
- Location within Colorado
- Location: 9345 U.S. Route 285
- Nearest city: Aspen Park, Colorado
- Coordinates: 39°32′48″N 105°16′39″W
- Built: March–October 1889
- Architectural style: vernacular Queen Anne
- NRHP reference No.: 90001479
- Added to NRHP: September 18, 1990

Midway House, also known as Broken M Bar Ranch and Meyer Ranch, is an 1889 Queen Anne ranch house located near Aspen Park, Colorado. It is listed on the National Register of Historic Places.

== History ==
The land now known as Meyer Ranch was homesteaded by the Duncan McIntyre family in the mid-19th century. Located near the Turkey Creek wagon road, they fed and lodged travelers.

The property was purchased in 1883 by Louis Ramboz, who had the house built in 1889 from lumber milled on the property. Midway House served as an overflow house for a stagecoach stop on the route from Denver to Fairplay, named because of its location midway between Denver and Bailey.

The ranch reportedly served as the winter quarters for animals of the P.T. Barnum Circus in the late 1880s, but there is no record of P.T. Barnum ever coming to Colorado. A board inscribed "Circus Town 1889" was found in the house during renovation in 1955.

After Ramboz, the ranch was owned by Ralph Kirkpatrick from 1912 to 1950 and run as a working ranch with a hillside cleared for skiing in the early 1940s. Skiers were transported from the road to the base of a single rope tow in horse-drawn sleighs. The ski area was known as Mount Lugo and, though it closed in 1942, the hills at Meyer Ranch are still enjoyed by cross-country and backcountry skiers.

In 1950, Norman and Ethel Meyer bought the ranch including Midway House. In 1959, they bought McIntyre's original homestead. The Meyers sold 400 acres (1.6 km^{2}) of their 600-acre (2.4 km^{2}) ranch to Jefferson County Open Space in 1987, which opened Meyer Ranch Park to the public in 1989. The house remains in the Meyers' ownership. As of September 2010, a preliminary agreement has been negotiated to conduct a feasibility study for the establishment of the house as a museum.

The location appeared on the pilot episode of the History Channel documentary series Mega Movers. It first aired on April 27, 2005, as a segment of the Modern Marvels episode "Mega Movers" (#337), which followed the move of a cabin and an 1870 hay and stock barn closer to the ranch house.

== See also ==
- National Register of Historic Places listings in Jefferson County, Colorado
