= Peterson House (Lakewood, Colorado) =

Historic house in Colorado, United States

- U.S. National Register of Historic Places
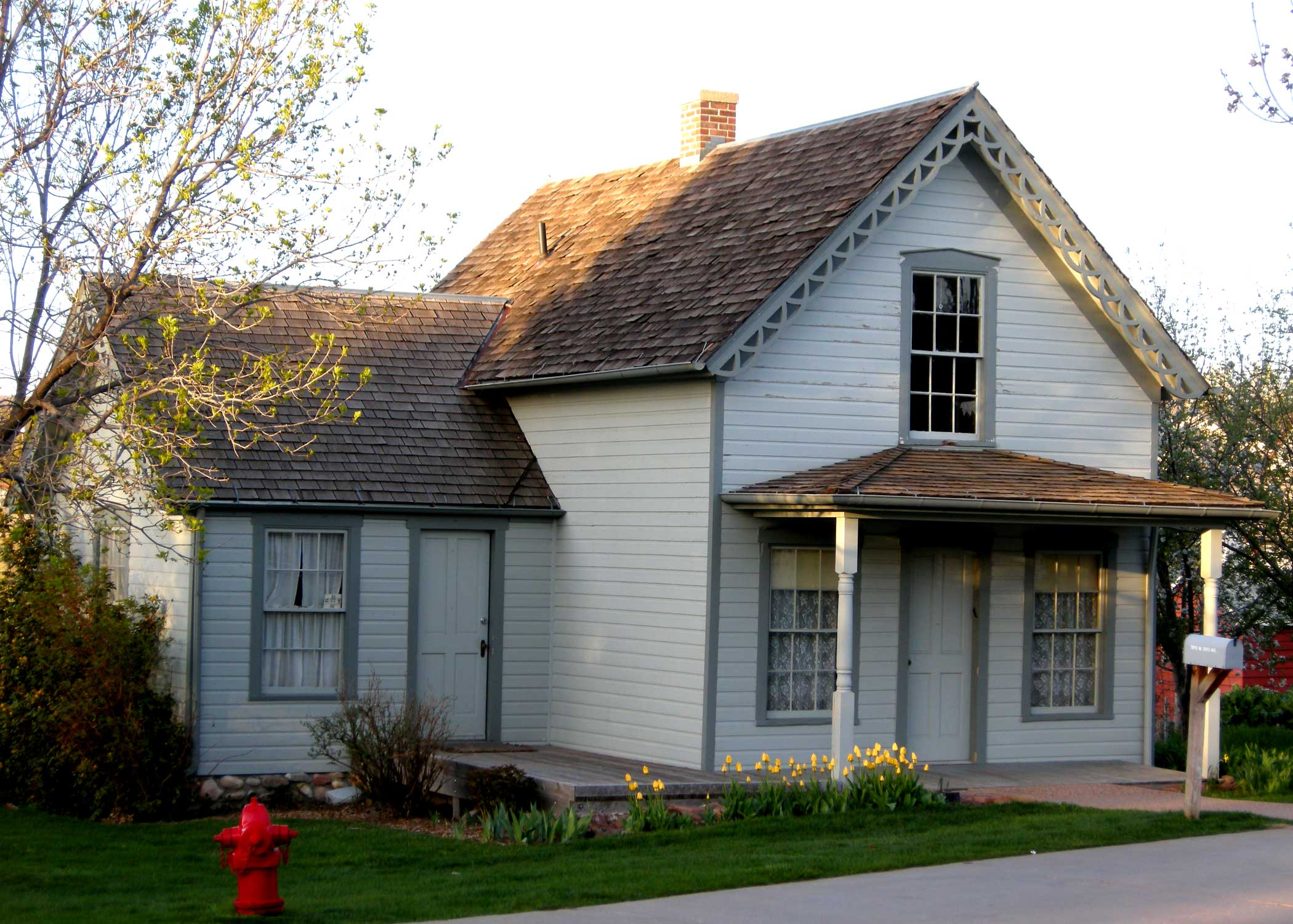

- Location within Colorado Location within the United States
- Nearest city: Lakewood, Colorado
- Coordinates: 39°38′24″N 105°7′45″W
- Built: c.1885
- NRHP reference No.: 81000184
- Added to NRHP: September 10, 1981

Peterson House, also known as Ticen (Tyson) House, in Lakewood, Colorado, USA, was built c. 1885. It was listed on the National Register of Historic Places in 1981.

It was deemed to be historically important as the only surviving early frame structure in the Bear Creek area, and also as the only surviving early structure of the historic Cowan neighborhood of Morrison, Colorado. It has a simplified Victorian vernacular architecture.

The historic Pioneer Union Ditch runs through the site.
