= Conifer Junction Schoolhouse =

- U.S. National Register of Historic Places
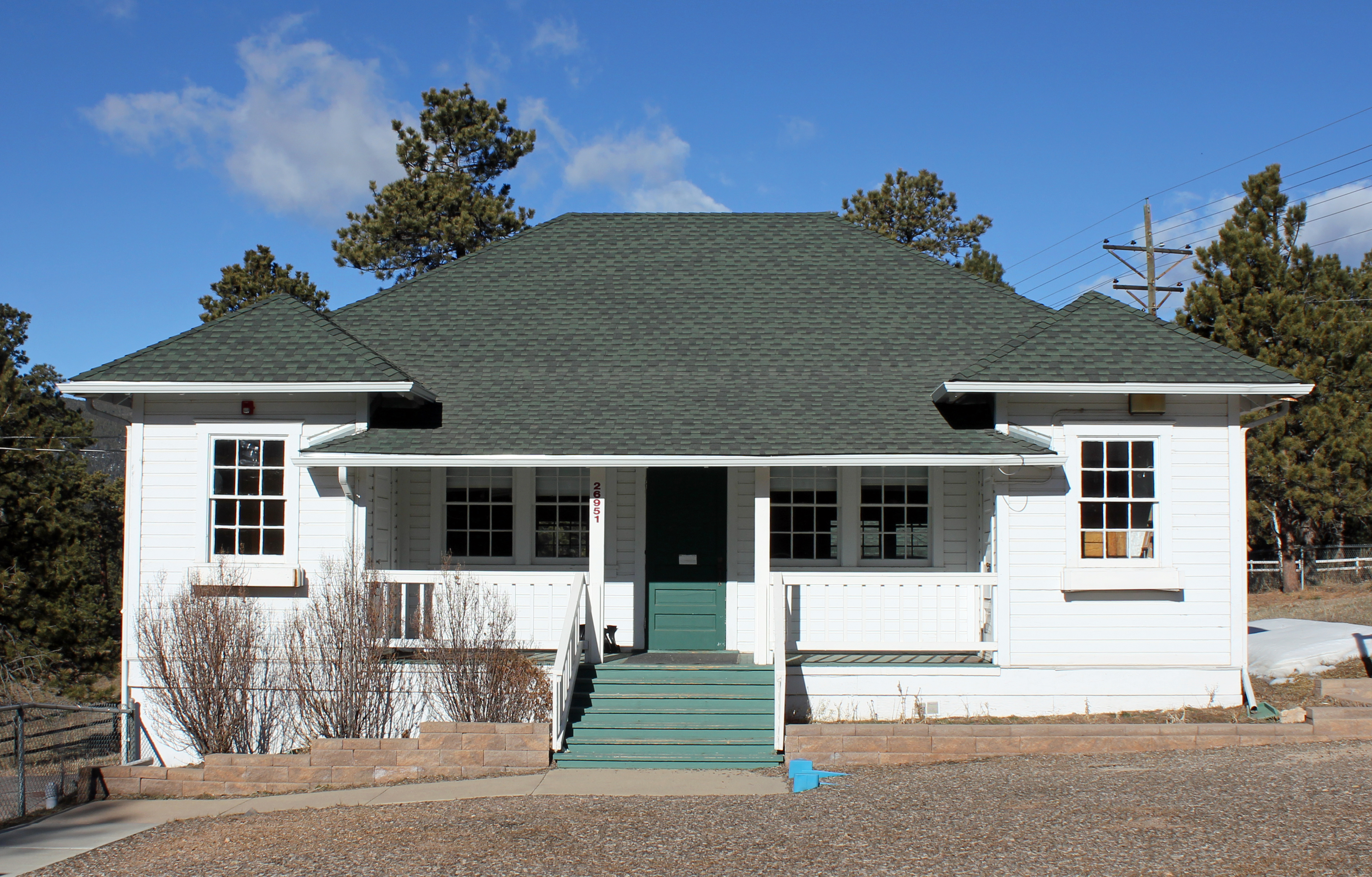

- Location within Colorado
- Location: 26951 Barkley Road, Conifer, Colorado
- Coordinates: 39°32′06″N 105°18′28″W
- Area: 1 acre (0.40 ha)
- Built: 1923
- Architectural style: Late 19th and Early 20th Century American Movements
- NRHP reference No.: 13001167
- Added to NRHP: February 10, 2014

The Conifer Junction Schoolhouse, at 26951 Barkley Road in Conifer, Colorado, was listed on the National Register of Historic Places in 2014. It was built in 1923.

It later served as a pre-school for many years.
