= Ammunition Igloo =

- U.S. National Register of Historic Places
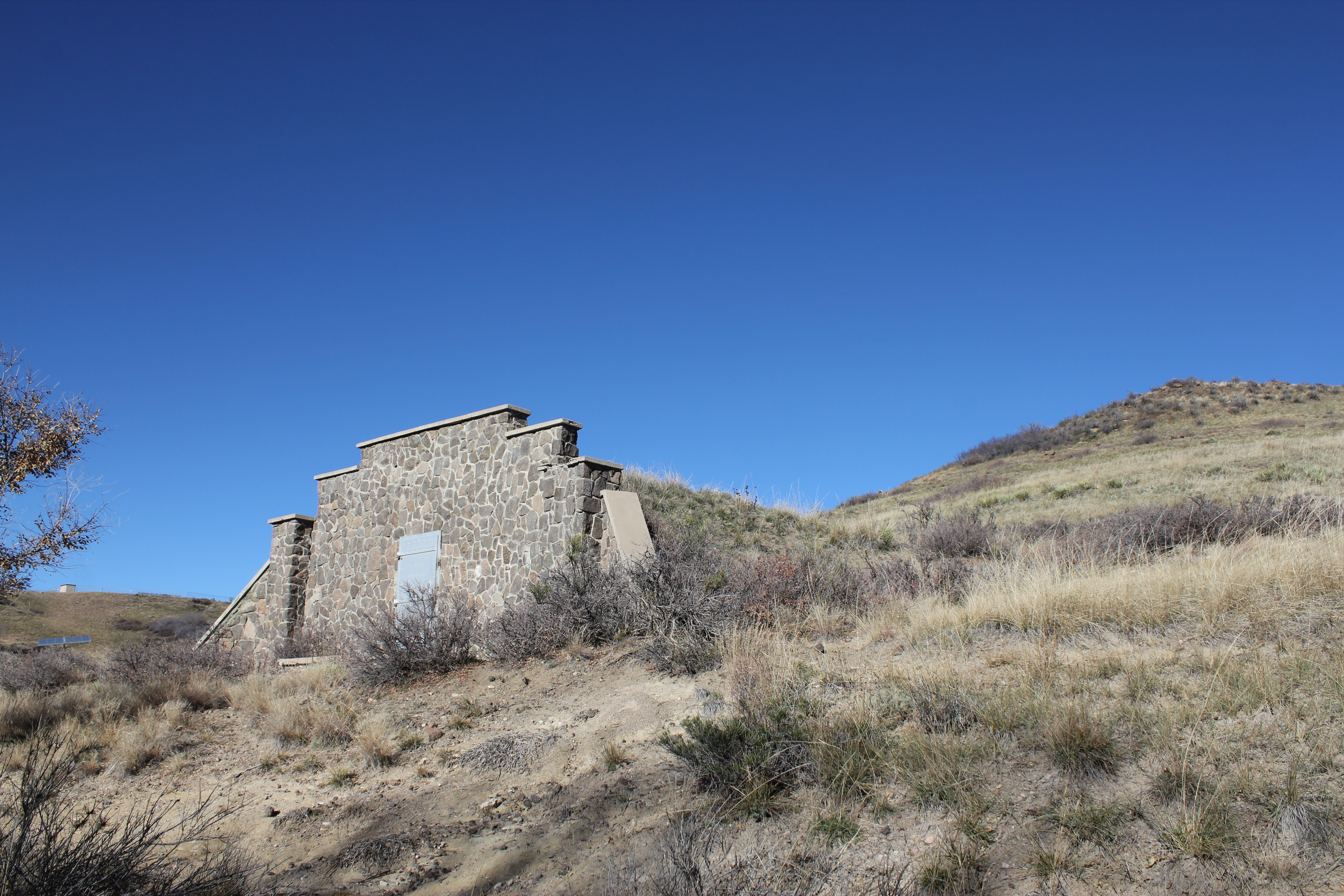
- The site in 2013.

- Location within Colorado Location within the United States
- Location: 15001 Denver West Parkway, Golden, Colorado
- Coordinates: 39°44′33″N 105°10′22″W
- Built: 1940
- Architect: Merchant, George H.
- MPS: Camp George West MPS
- NRHP reference No.: 93000379
- Added to NRHP: May 20, 1993

Ammunition Igloo (also known as Building 88) was a bunker used for arms storage at Camp George West, Golden, Colorado. It was built in 1940 of stone, supported by a soil-covered concrete arch. Rubble masonry, built of basalt, was used for the parapet-equipped facade.

The Ammunition Igloo currently resides within the National Renewable Energy Laboratory's site boundary. In 2023, the laboratory renamed the bunker internally to the "Ammunition Bunker" to add clarification to the name and respect the native, cultural meaning behind the word "igloo".

It was listed on the National Register of Historic Places in 1993.

== See also ==
- National Register of Historic Places listings in Jefferson County, Colorado
