= James H. Baugh =

American farmer and Colorado pioneer (1832–1891)

- Born: February 6, 1832; Missouri
- Died: August 15, 1891 (aged 59); Longmont, Colorado
- Occupation: Farmer
- Known for: Early pioneer of Colorado Territory, builder of historic sod house and log cabin, both on the National Register of Historic Places

James H. Baugh (February 6, 1832 – August 15, 1891), born in Missouri, was a Colorado pioneer. In 1859, he followed the Pike's Peak Gold Rush to present-day Colorado, which was in Kansas Territory at the time and became Colorado Territory in 1861. Baugh homesteaded 160 acres near Clear Creek in present-day Wheat Ridge, Colorado where he operated a farm and an orchard. He built irrigation ditches from Clear Creek for his potato, oat, and wheat fields and orchard trees. Baugh was an active community member and political figure, which helped the town grow. Two of his homes, Pioneer Sod House and the James H. Baugh House, are listed on the National Register of Historic Places.

In 1877, Baugh moved to Longmont, Colorado, where he continued to farm and married later in life. His daughter, Hattie, was born soon after he died.

== Early life ==
James H. Baugh, born in Missouri on February 6, 1832, was the son of Louisa and James F. Baugh, a farmer. He lived in St. Charles County, Missouri with his parents and siblings in 1850. Baugh was the oldest child on the 1850 census. His younger siblings were Julius C., Harvey S., Francis L., John B., Robert E. Baugh, Sarah, and Joseph.

== Colorado pioneer ==
=== Clear Creek Valley ===
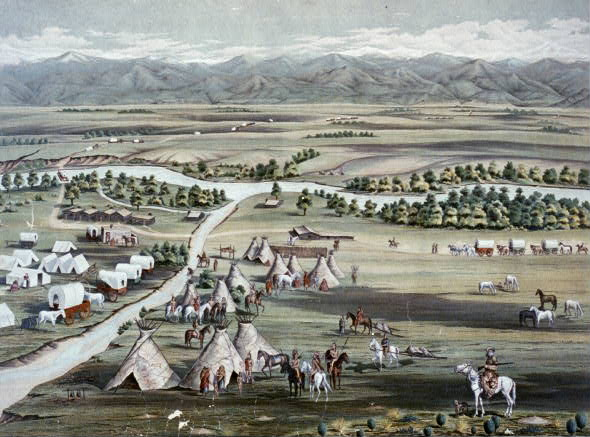
Native Americans and Colorado pioneers camped at the confluence of the South Platte River and Cherry Creek, an area that became part of Denver, Colorado

Baugh arrived in Denver on June 1, 1859, at the confluence of the South Platte River and Cherry Creek. He settled and began farming on August 15, 1859, .25 miles (0.40 km) from Clear Creek and along the Old Prospect Trail in present-day Wheat Ridge, Colorado. He was among the first settlers in the Clear Creek Valley of Kansas Territory, which became Colorado Territory in 1861. The Old Prospect Trail ran from Denver to Golden, Colorado and mining camps.

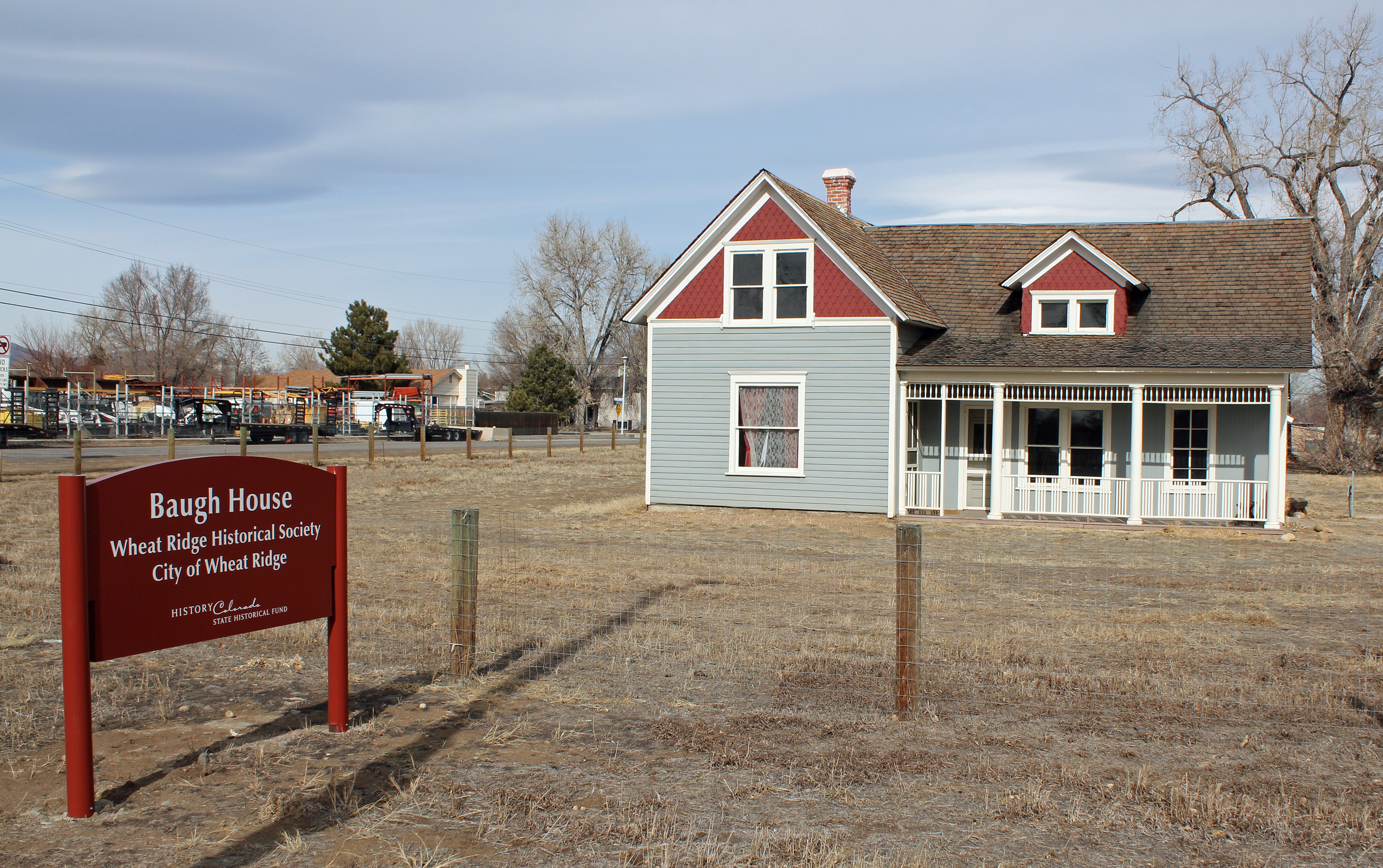
James H. Baugh House, an 1859 log cabin that is now "entirely enclosed in a Late Victorian farmhouse"

Baugh built a log cabin in 1859 on a 160-acre parcel of homesteaded land. The cabin, which he expanded in 1877 and ca. 1892 to a Victorian farmhouse, is located at 44th Avenue and Robb Street. (Note: The house stands now on three acres of the original homesteaded land. The log cabin is "entirely enclosed within a Late Victorian farmhouse".) Baugh was a bachelor for many years. He hired laborers to work his farm.

Baugh was politically active, influencing legislation and the community's growth. During his years in the Clear Creek Valley, he sat on a grand jury, was a petit juror, and led an effort to relocate a road. He also sat on the school board and was a delegate for Jefferson County to the 1868 State Democratic Convention. Baugh spoke out against high taxation of farmers and high railroad taxes. He was a charter member of the local chapter of the National Grange of the Order of Patrons of Husbandry. It was the first grange in Colorado Territory. He was a member of the Society of Colorado Pioneers.

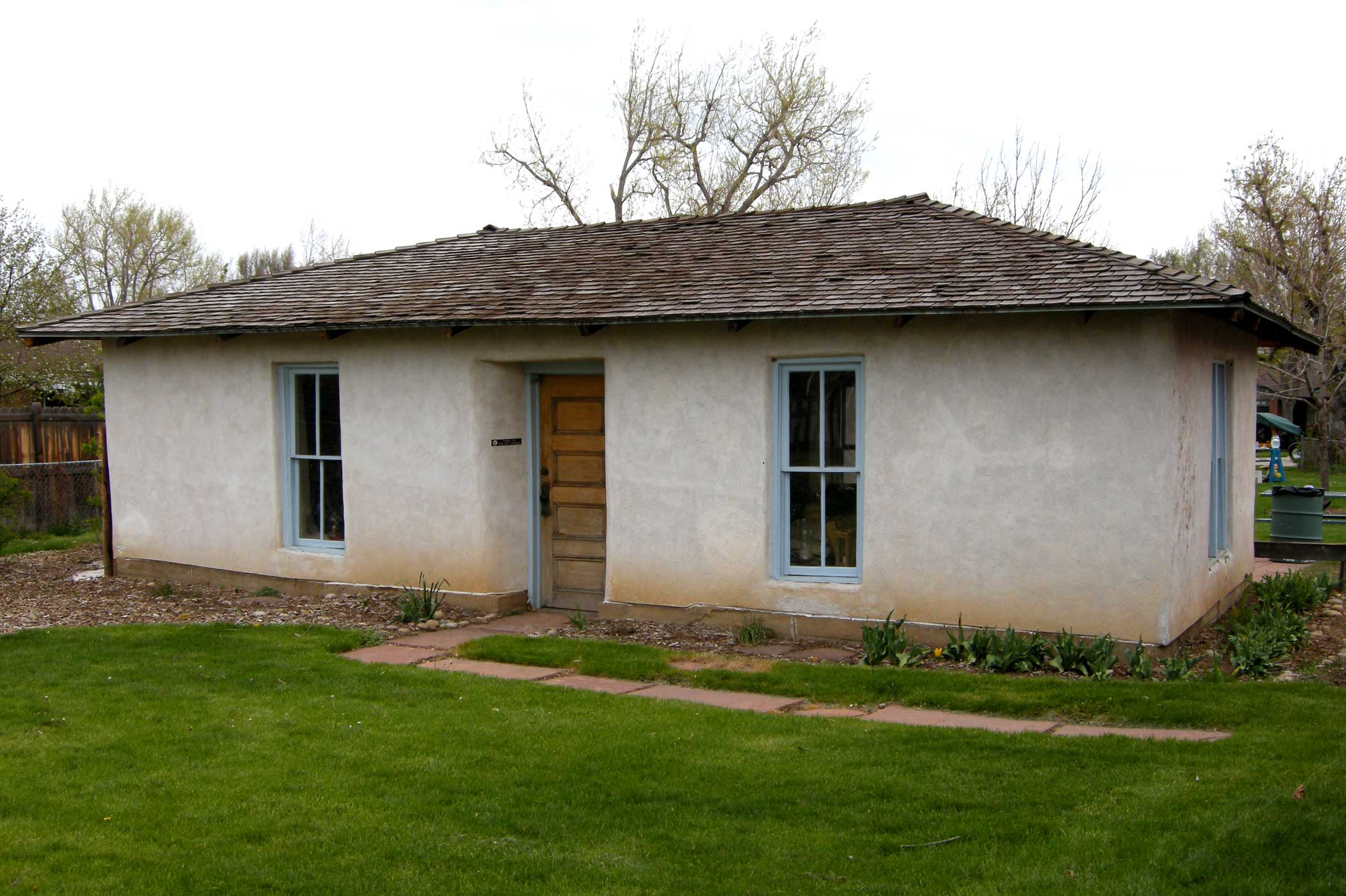
Pioneer Sod House

Baugh built what is called Pioneer Sod House between 1863 and 1870, Since the sod house was built with tall prairie grass, it is likely that the house was built before 1864 when the prairie grass was gone.

Baugh ran a farm and orchard on the land, using water from irrigation ditches from Clear Creek, and raised chickens. He grew potatoes, oats, wheat, and vegetables. He sold his produce in mining camps and Denver.

Baugh was unable to pay property taxes in 1876 and he left the Wheat Ridge area in 1877 Also unable to pay the 1880 property taxes, the county treasurer put his farm up for sale to pay taxes. Baugh rented out his farm at that time. He subdivided his 160-acre parcel of land in 1888 and 1889 and sold the farmhouse in 1889 to Samuel Longenecker.

=== Longmont ===
Baugh moved to the Longmont, Colorado area in 1877. He lived in Weld County, Colorado in 1880. On December 22, 1889, Baugh married Mary J. Brown in Denver, and they lived on a farm near Longmont. Baugh died August 15, 1891, on his farm in Longmont. Mary gave birth to their daughter Hattie a few days after Baugh died in 1891. Hattie Baugh Gibson inherited her father's homestead parcels.

== Bibliography ==
- "Baugh, James H., House, National Register of Historic Places Nomination Form" (PDF). History Colorado. National Register of Historic Places. May 29, 2012. pp. 1, 3.
