= Quaintance Block =

- U.S. National Register of Historic Places
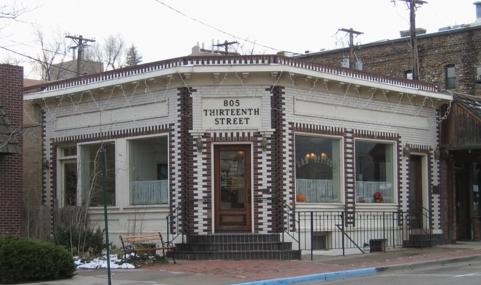
- Location: 805 13th Street, Golden, CO
- Coordinates: 39°45′15.12″N 105°13′12.98″W
- Built: 1911
- Built by: James H. Gow
- Architect: James H. Gow
- Architectural style: Early Commercial
- NRHP reference No.: 94000261
- Added to NRHP: March 25, 1994

The Quaintance Block was the first storefront in historic downtown Golden, Colorado, to be listed on the National Register of Historic Places. Built in 1911, it is a one-of-a-kind architectural landmark combining Victorian and presaging modern styles, featuring unique experimental glazed bricks. It is also fondly remembered among locals as the Spudnut Shop.

It was listed on the National Register in 1994. It consists of the original 1911 glazed brick building, plus a newer basement structure, plus a rear blond brick addition.

== History ==
The Quaintance Block was originally built in 1911 directly on the southeast corner of 13th Street and Washington Avenue, just to the east of its present location. Charles F. Quaintance, a son of pioneers, built this as his new building to house, in its three storefronts, his photo shop (13th Street storefront), Quaintance Realty & Investment Company (corner storefront), and the law office of his brother Arthur (Washington Avenue storefront). A highly astute businessman and promoter, Quaintance strategically located his building across from both of Golden's tramway depots on the opposite corners, luring passengers by advertising his Castle Rock Resort overlooking town. Here, eager patrons would get their photos taken with burros, which would take them up the mountain, and while they were away, Quaintance developed their photos to be ready when the tourists returned. Meanwhile in 1912 the building also became the headquarters of the Herold China and Pottery Company, of which Quaintance served as secretary, which moved to its plant proper in 1914 and is prominent today as CoorsTek. After the Castle Rock Resort faded following the advent of the Denver Mountain Parks, Quaintance concentrated on other pursuits, and after he moved to Denver in 1919 turned over active possession of the building and investment company to his father Brough and the photo shop to other owners. In 1923 the building was moved 65 feet west to make way for downtown's first stand-alone service station (a Conoco) on the corner, facing upon a courtyard with rooftop billboard shifted east. After Brough Quaintance's death in 1946 the investment company ceased operation.

The building was sold to Ernie Waters, who converted it into the Golden Furniture Store, later owned by Cliff Evans. After Evans consolidated it with another furniture store that he purchased on Washington Avenue, Leonard and Pat Dunn opened the Spudnut Shop here in 1953. Quickly becoming beloved among Goldenites, it was a shop of the national chain which sold, from Alaska to Mexico, delicious donuts made from potato flour ("spud"nuts). Customers often bought them at the shop, while Dunn also sent out delivery boys carrying baskets of Spudnuts, whom he called his "little businessmen". Later owned by Eleanor Laseman, the shop closed when its space was annexed by neighboring Jeffco Blueprints office supply store in 1984. After this closed, the building was faithfully restored to its original appearance in 1990 under direction of Conrad and Ingrid Gardner, becoming home to among other tenants the Gardner law office as the longest office home of Golden's longest practicing attorney Conrad E. Gardner (52 years). It continues housing multiple tenants today and has housed 14 businesses of the legal profession over time, including those of three judges. The Quaintance Block was designated a Golden and Colorado landmark in 1993 and was listed on the National Register of Historic Places in 1994. It is one of the rare moved buildings to have achieved such high designation, in recognition of its architecture.

== Architecture ==
The unique design of the Quaintance Block has long defied simple explanation and has fascinated the preservation community for years. It is made of experimental enameled bricks from the United States Glazed Brick & Pottery works, which operated during the 1910s on far West 8th Street in Golden. It is one of only four known remaining buildings using these bricks including Denver Union Station, the Maas Residence at 423 10th Street in Golden, and Byron White United States Courthouse, all of which are either listed upon or officially determined eligible for the National Historic Register. The bricks, made with white enamel fused to the brick body through a single firing process, were renowned in their time for their beauty, quality like fine china, and would not crack or craze. In overall design, the storefront is premodernist but features a pressed metal cornice looking back on earlier times, even ancient times with its Greek styling. However, its predominantly white walls and geometry look forward to art nouveau and modernist design, while its brickwork quoins complete the unusual design. The Quaintance Block was designed and constructed by architect James H. Gow, locally raised and educated at Jarvis Hall college.

== See also ==
- National Register of Historic Places listings in Jefferson County, Colorado
