= Buffalo Creek, Colorado =

Unincorporated community in Jefferson County, Colorado, United States

- Unincorporated community
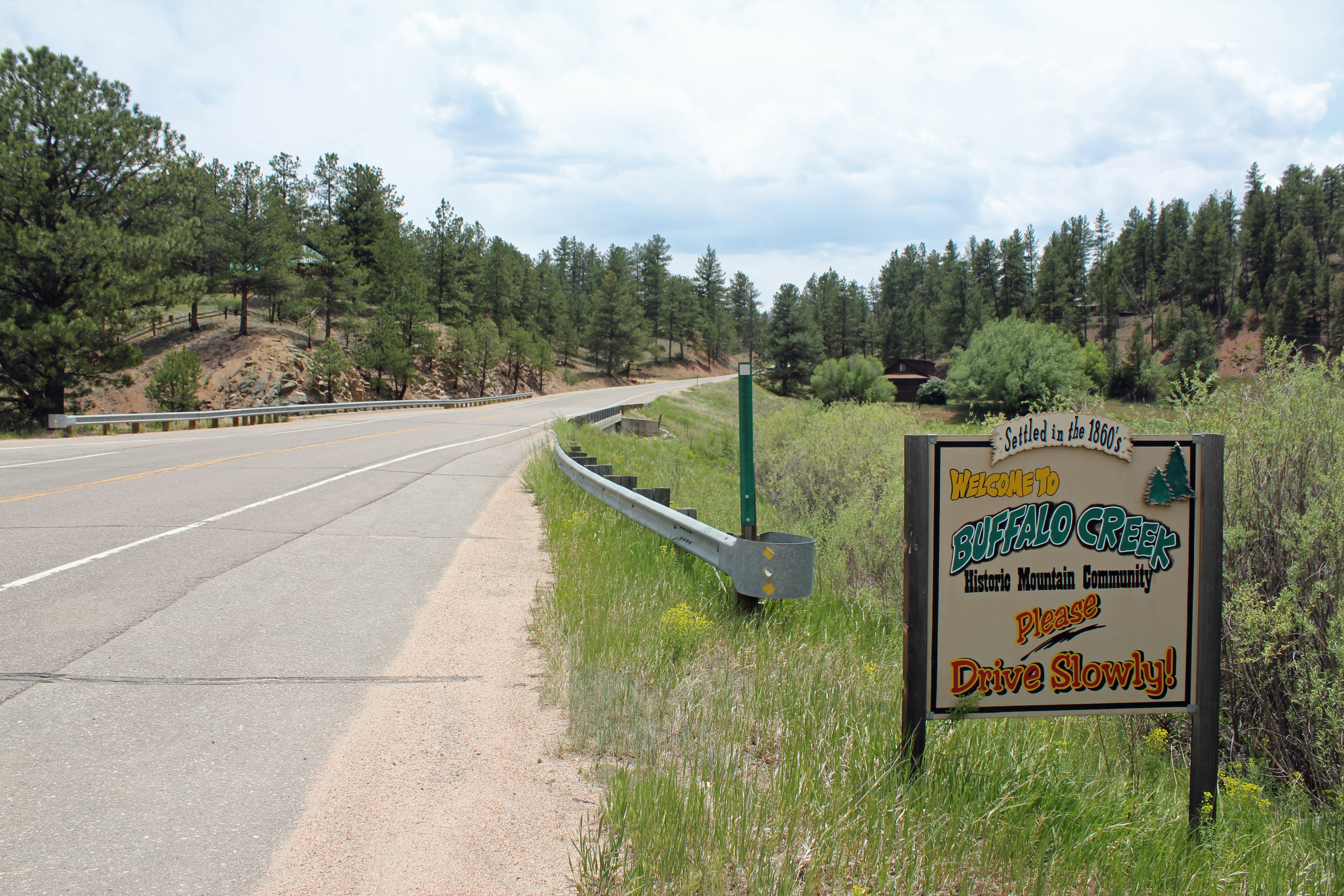
- Entering Buffalo Creek from the north

- Location of Buffalo Creek, Colorado. Buffalo Creek (Colorado)
- Coordinates: 39°23′12″N 105°16′13″W
- Country: United States
- State: Colorado
- County: Jefferson County
- Established: About 1877

Government
  - Type: Unincorporated community
  - Body: Jefferson County
- Elevation: 6,749 ft (2,057 m)
- Time zone: UTC−07:00 (MST)
  - Summer (DST): UTC−06:00 (MDT)
- ZIP code: 80425
- GNIS pop ID: 183309
- FIPS code: 08-0

Buffalo Creek is an unincorporated community and U.S. Post Office in Jefferson County, Colorado, United States. The ZIP Code of the Buffalo Creek Post Office is 80425.

== History ==
The town of Buffalo Creek was established about 1877 along the stream of the same name. The Buffalo Creek, Colorado, post office operated from August 16, 1878, until September 13, 1963. The town has been destroyed by fire several times. The Colorado Trail is approximately 5 miles from Buffalo Creek. It is open for hiking, biking and camping. The Pike National Forest runs through Buffalo Creek where the elevation is 6500 to 6700 ft.

== Geography ==
Only parts of the pine forest in and nearby have been caught ablaze, not the entire area.

== See also ==
- Front Range Urban Corridor
