= BVSD =

BVSD may refer to:

- Blue Valley School District
- Boulder Valley School District
