= New Vista High School =

Public high school in Colorado, US

Location
- 700 20th Street; Boulder, Colorado 80302; United States; 40°00′03″N 105°16′02″W

Information
- Type: Public high school
- Established: 1993 (33 years ago)
- Founder: Rona Wilensky
- School district: Boulder Valley School District
- CEEB code: 060112
- Principal: John McCluskey
- Teaching staff: 17.56 (FTE)
- Grades: 9–12
- Enrollment: 319 (2023–2024)
- Student to teacher ratio: 18.17
- Colors: Black and teal
- Athletics: Ultimate frisbee
- Mascot: Owl
- Website: nvh.bvsd.org

New Vista is a small public high school in Boulder, Colorado, United States. It was founded in 1993 by Rona Wilensky.

== Academics ==
NVHS runs on a quarter system. Unusual in public education is its grading standard, which requires a grade of B− or better in order to pass a class.

New Vista maintains relationships with the nearby University of Colorado and both major high schools in Boulder, Boulder High School and Fairview High School, allowing students access to courses available through those institutions.

New Vista works on a different credit system from other regional public schools, but transfer students are still accepted. Two NVHS credits are equal to either one year at a traditional high school or one MAPS (Minimum Academic Preparation Standards) credit.

In order to graduate, NVHS students must complete a Culminating Project, a substantial work designed and executed independently by seniors.

== Community ==
Every student at New Vista is assigned to a mixed-grade advisory class which they attend for all four years. Advisors help students stay on track with academics, scheduling and general support.

Community Gatherings are held once a week every Monday. A mandatory opportunity for students and teachers to gather as a whole and discuss recent/upcoming events, any important announcements and other critical details.

== Career development ==
On Wednesdays, school ends at 12:50 and the students can either do a workshop or a Community Experience. Workshops take place on and off campus, led by diverse professionals from the community on a variety of subjects. Past workshops have included herbalism, improvisation, embroidery, and knitting. During Community Experiences, students seek out and then work quarter-long unpaid internships at local businesses. NVHS also has service learning and extra-credit language programs.

== Extracurricular activities ==
New Vista has a successful, award-winning ultimate frisbee program, open to all students. It is home to the only co-ed volleyball team in the state, which won a 2007 state championship.

=== Other athletics ===
Athletics at New Vista are limited, so many students participate in other schools' sports teams. Students who participate in Colorado High School Activities Association (CHSAA) sports at other high schools can receive a fee waiver for 0.4 credit per season completed.

=== Earth Task Force ===
Earth Task Force is New Vista's environmental action group. Since its inception the program has received several grants and awards, including the $10,000 Green Prize in public education for its creativity in greening the school using limited resources.

== Renovations ==
The BVSD Bond Program has allowed New Vista to undergo facility renovations in the main office, the cafeteria and the study center.
