= Roslyn Mickelson =

Roslyn A. Mickelson is a University of North Carolina at Charlotte (UNCC) chancellor's professor with appointments in the Sociology Department, Public Policy Program, and women & gender studies. An American sociologist and educator known for her extensive research on educational inequality, school desegregation and segregation, racial, gender, and social class disparities in educational processes and outcomes, and the sociological roots of student success in Science, Technology, Engineering, and Mathematics (STEM).

== Early life and education ==
Mickelson was born April 3, 1948, in Ottawa, Ontario, Canada. At an early age, she moved to Los Angeles, California, and was raised there. She earned a Bachelor of Arts degree in anthropology from the University of California, Los Angeles (UCLA) and continued her education there, earning two master's degrees – sociology of education (1974) and sociology (1980) – and received her Ph.D. of sociology in 1984.

== Academic career ==
Following her doctorate, she spent the 1984–1985 academic year at the University of Michigan-Ann Arbor on a postdoctoral fellowship in the Bush Foundation Grant Program: Bush Program in Child Development and Public Policy, however, her career in education actually began in 1970 as a (Southern California) public high school social studies teacher for 9-years. The questions raised during this time led her to pursue her doctorate. Following the fellowship, she accepted an appointment as an assistant professor of sociology at the University of North Carolina at Charlotte and so moved to Charlotte, North Carolina, in 1986. She has been a visiting scholar at several US and international universities including Stanford University, UCLA, the University of Ghent (Belgium), and Murdoch University (Australia).

== Research and contributions ==
Mickelson's research began in 1970, while a Southern California public high school social studies teacher. These experiences raised many questions that led her to pursue a doctorate in the hopes of finding answers to them. Her latest research is in the political economy of schooling and school reform, focusing on the relationships among race and gender and the educational outcomes of those relationships.

Her research is in the political economy of schooling and school reform, focusing on the relationships among race and gender and the educational outcomes of those relationships.

In 1997 William Capacchione's daughter was denied enrollment in a magnet school in Charlotte. The Capacchione family filed suit against the Charlotte Mecklenburg Board of Education siting racial discrimination. Mickelson served as an expert witness for the school board, testifying that the girl had been denied enrollment as a result of established guidelines and not because of race. The case went all the way to the Supreme Court, who declined to hear it. The US Appeal Courts ruling was upheld and the school board won.

She remains a Research Advisory Panel member for the National Coalition on School Diversity.

== Awards and honors ==
Mickelson was appointed chancellor’s professor at UNC-Charlotte (2014).

- Elected (Jul 2024) to the National Academy of Education National Academy of Education.
- Fellow (2020), American Educational Research Association since 2020 (https://www.aera.net/Portals/38/2010_Fellows_NewsRelease_030810.pdf).
- Fellow (2004), National Education Policy Center since 2004 (https://nepc.colorado.edu/fellows).

== Selected publications ==
- Yesterday, Today and Tomorrow: School Desegregation and Re-segregation in Charlotte
- Children on the Streets of the Americas: Globalization, Homelessness and Education in the United States, Brazil, and Cuba
