= Derrick Goold =

American author and sportswriter (born 1975)

Derrick S. Goold (born July 21, 1975) is an American author and sportswriter best known for his work for the St. Louis Post-Dispatch. Goold has been honored for feature writing and investigative reporting for his work covering baseball, hockey and college athletics. He is also a contributor to Baseball America and an on-air talent for several St. Louis, Missouri, radio stations.

Goold was president of the Baseball Writers' Association of America in 2016 after serving as vice president in 2015.

== Early life ==
Goold was born in Elgin, Illinois, on July 21, 1975, and moved to Boulder, Colorado, in 1983. He attended Centaurus High School in Lafayette, Colorado, rival high school of Cardinals General Manager John Mozeliak's Fairview High School. Goold earned the rank of Eagle Scout while in high school. He graduated in 1993 and enrolled in the University of Missouri. A recipient of the Jack Buck Award, Goold earned a Bachelor of Journalism and a bachelor's degree in political science from the Missouri School of Journalism. He also spent a summer abroad studying at Oxford University.

While enrolled at Mizzou, he worked for the independent student newspaper The Maneater, where he not only wrote but contributed editorial cartoons. In 1996, he was awarded first place for In-Depth Reporting for his story on MU athletics and the dry campus policy and third place for his comic strip, "Status Quo" by the Missouri College Media Association.

== Career ==
Goold began his career in 1997 as a staff writer at The Times-Picayune in New Orleans, Louisiana. Initially he was a prep writer covering St. Tammany Parish and New Orleans city schools. He was awarded the Louisiana Sports Writers Association Prep Writer of the Year award for 1998–1999 and won Best Prep Feature in 2000. He went on to cover Louisiana State University football and baseball as well as women's basketball before leaving the paper in 2000 to work for the now-defunct Rocky Mountain News.

While at the Rocky Mountain News, Goold covered the Denver Nuggets, Colorado Avalanche and Colorado Rockies. After 10 months at the paper, he accepted a job as the St. Louis Blues beat writer for the Post-Dispatch in St. Louis. After 2004, he moved to the baseball beat, exclusively covering the St. Louis Cardinals. Since then, Goold has won numerous awards, including four APSE awards, an APME award and a Lee Enterprises President's Award.

In addition to his work at the paper, he has been a correspondent for Baseball America since 2005, covering the Cardinals and their farm system. His writing appears in the Baseball America magazine, as well as online and in the annual Prospects Handbook. He also acts as an on-air correspondent for MLB Network. Goold appears frequently on the radio, co-hosting a daily two-hour show called The Writers' Block on the CBS Sports Radio station in St. Louis as well as appearing frequently on KMOX and 101 ESPN Radio. He also hosts a podcast, titled The Best Podcast In Baseball. Goold has over 114,000 followers on Twitter.

== Personal life ==
Goold lives in St. Louis with his wife Erika and his son. The couple met at the University of Missouri and married in 2000. Erika worked for KSDK, the city's NBC affiliate before taking a job as publicist for the St. Louis Symphony Orchestra. She is currently the Senior News Director for Business, Engineering and Innovation at Washington University in St. Louis.

Goold is an avid collector of baseball cards, often writing stories on players who share his interest.

He also collects comic books, a passion that began when he bought Amazing Spider-Man#270 in his youth. Many years later, he was invited to write a letter which appeared in Amazing Spider-Man#700. He also contributed as a writer to the comic Home Brew: Handcrafted Tales From the Gateway City, published by Ink and Drink Comics, a collective of comic book writers, artists and enthusiasts from around the St. Louis area. On September 29, 2019, Goold performed CPR on a videographer who suffered a heart attack and stroke at Busch Stadium; the stadium doctor stated Goold's actions "probably saved [the videographer's] life."

== Books ==
In 2012, Goold wrote 100 Things Cardinals Fans Should Know & Do Before They Die, a collection of stories, facts, achievements and signature calls from the 125-year history of the St. Louis Cardinals. The foreword was written by Stan Musial.

== Awards and honors ==
- 1998-1999—Louisiana Sports Writers Association Prep Writer of the Year
- 2000—Louisiana Sports Writers Association Best Prep Feature
- 2010—Associated Press Sports Editors Explanatory Writing Award (2nd place)
- 2013—Lee Enterprises President's Award for Innovation (video)
- 2015—Associated Press Sports Editors Beat Writing Award (3rd place), Missouri Associated Press Managing Editors Award for Best Spot Sports (1st place)
- 2016—Associated Press Sports Editors Beat Writing Award (1st place, circulation 75-175,000)
