= Schools of Opportunity =

Awards project for educational institutions

- Location: Boulder, Colorado
- Founder: Carol Corbett Burris
- Country: United States
- Launched: 2014; 12 years ago
- Website: https://www.schoolsofopportunity.org/

Schools of Opportunity is a project that aims to recognize public high schools that implement equitable practices to reduce opportunity gaps and support student success. The National Education Policy Center, a non-profit education policy research center, created Schools of Opportunity as a project in 2014.

== Mission ==
The Schools of Opportunity project gives annual "gold" and "silver" recognition to schools in the United States. The project seeks to recognize those high schools that follow practices such as supporting students' physical and psychological health, having outreach to the community, and having a broad, enriched curriculum. It is built on criteria set forth in the 2013 book, Closing the Opportunity Gap.

The Schools of Opportunity project believes that high quality schools are those that use research-based practices, and that standardized testing mainly reflects the student's learning opportunities outside of school; therefore,the project does not primarily evaluate schools based on effectiveness as measured by standardized test scores. That is, the project illustrates an alternative to ranking systems based on test score, which have been criticized for favoring schools serving more advantaged student populations. Schools submit initial applications explaining and documenting why they should be recognized with a reward. Then, after two online reviews and one school visit, the gold and silver recognitions are announced. In order to qualify for recognition, the school must be a public or charter school; it must enroll high school students; at least 10% of the school must qualify for free or reduced-price lunch; the percentage of students with Individualized Education Programs must not fall 2 or more points below the district where the school is located; the school must commit to ensuring all students have access to rich, challenging but supported learning opportunities; and it must be committed to non-exclusionary discipline practices. While designated Schools of Opportunity do not receive extra funding, the directors of the project hope for them to serve as role models for other peers.

== Origins ==
Schools of Opportunity was founded in 2014 in New York and Colorado by the National Education Policy Center and expanded across the United States in 2015. The project has been funded by, among others, the Ford Foundation, the NEA Foundation, and Voqal.

== List of recipients ==
2015 Recipients
School	Reward
Centaurus High School	Gold
Fannie Lou Hamer Freedom High School	Gold
Grand Valley High School	Gold
Jefferson County Open School	Gold
Malverne High School	Gold
Center High School	Silver
Charles D’Amico High School	Silver
Durango High School	Silver
Eastridge High School	Silver
Elwood – John H. Glenn High School	Silver
Fox Lane High School	Silver
Harrison High School	Silver
Long Beach High School	Silver
Long View High School	Silver
Mapleton Early College High School	Silver
Sleepy Hollow High School	Silver
Sunset Park High School	Silver

2016 Recipients
School	Reward
Crater Renaissance Academy	Gold
Hillsdale High School	Gold
Leland and Gray Union Middle and High School	Gold
Rainier Beach High School	Gold
Revere High School	Gold
Rochester International Academy	Gold
South Side High School	Gold
William Smith High School	Gold
Boston Arts Academy	Silver
Cedar Shoals High School	Silver
Clarke Central High School	Silver
East Rockaway High School	Silver
New Vista High	Silver
Northwest High School	Silver
Oakland International High	Silver
Ossining High School	Silver
Quilcene High School	Silver
Stillman Valley High School	Silver
Urbana High School	Silver
Washington Technology Magnet School	Silver

2017 Recipients
School	Reward
Broome Street Academy Charter High School	Gold
Chicago High School for Agricultural Sciences	Gold
Denver South High School	Gold
Health Sciences High & Middle College	Gold
Lincoln High School	Gold
Seaside High School	Gold
Hammond High School	Silver
William C. Hinkley High School	Silver

2018-2019 Recipients
School	Reward
Casco Bay High School	Gold
Clark Street Community School	Gold
Native American Community Academy	Gold
Pocomoke High School	Gold
Salt Lake Center for Science Education	Gold
Social Justice Humanitas	Gold
Martin Luther King Jr. Early College	Silver
