= Sam Chaltain =

- Born: Samuel Spelman Chaltain
- Education: University of Wisconsin–Madison (BA); College of William & Mary (MA); George Washington University (MBA)
- Occupations: Educator, businessman
- Spouse: Sarah Margon (m. 2004)

Samuel Spelman "Sam" Chaltain is an American educator and businessman. He was the national director of the Forum for Education and Democracy, a Washington, D.C.–based education think tank. He is also the founding director of the Five Freedoms Project, a national organization that equips local educators with the leadership development, coaching and support.

== Education ==
Chaltain earned a Bachelor of Arts degree in African American studies and history from the University of Wisconsin–Madison, a Master of Arts in American studies from the College of William & Mary, and a Master of Business Administration from George Washington University.

== Career ==
Before founding the Five Freedoms Project, Chaltain spent five years at the First Amendment Center as the co-director of the First Amendment Schools program, a national K-12 reform initiative. Chaltain came to the center from the public school system of New York City, where he taught high school English and history. He also spent four years teaching the same subjects at a private school in Brooklyn. Chaltain worked as a speechwriter in the United States Department of Education during the Obama administration.

Sam's first teaching experience was in Beijing, China, where he joined the faculty of the foreign languages department at Beijing Normal University as a visiting lecturer. He taught two American history and literature courses to third-year undergraduates.

Chaltain's writings about his work have appeared in both magazines and newspapers, including Education Week and USA Today. He is also the author or co-author of five books: Faces of Learning: 50 Inspiring Stories of What Works in Education (Wiley 2011); We Must Not Be Afraid to be Free: Stories About Free Expression in America (Oxford University Press, 2010); American Schools: The Art of Creating a Democratic Learning Community (Rowman & Littlefield, 2009); First Freedoms: A Documentary History of First Amendment Rights in America (Oxford 2006); and The First Amendment in Schools (ASCD, 2003).

Chaltain has contributed articles and blogs to HuffPost, The New York Times, and the National Education Policy Center.

== Personal life ==
Chaltain and his wife, Sarah Margon, married in 2004.

== Selected publications ==
=== Books ===
- We Must Not Be Afraid to be Free: Stories About Free Expression in America (Oxford University Press, 2010);
- American Schools: The Art of Creating a Democratic Learning Community (Rowman & Littlefield, 2009);
- First Freedoms: A Documentary History of First Amendment Rights in America (Oxford 2006);
- The First Amendment in Schools (ASCD, 2003).
