= Ossining High School =

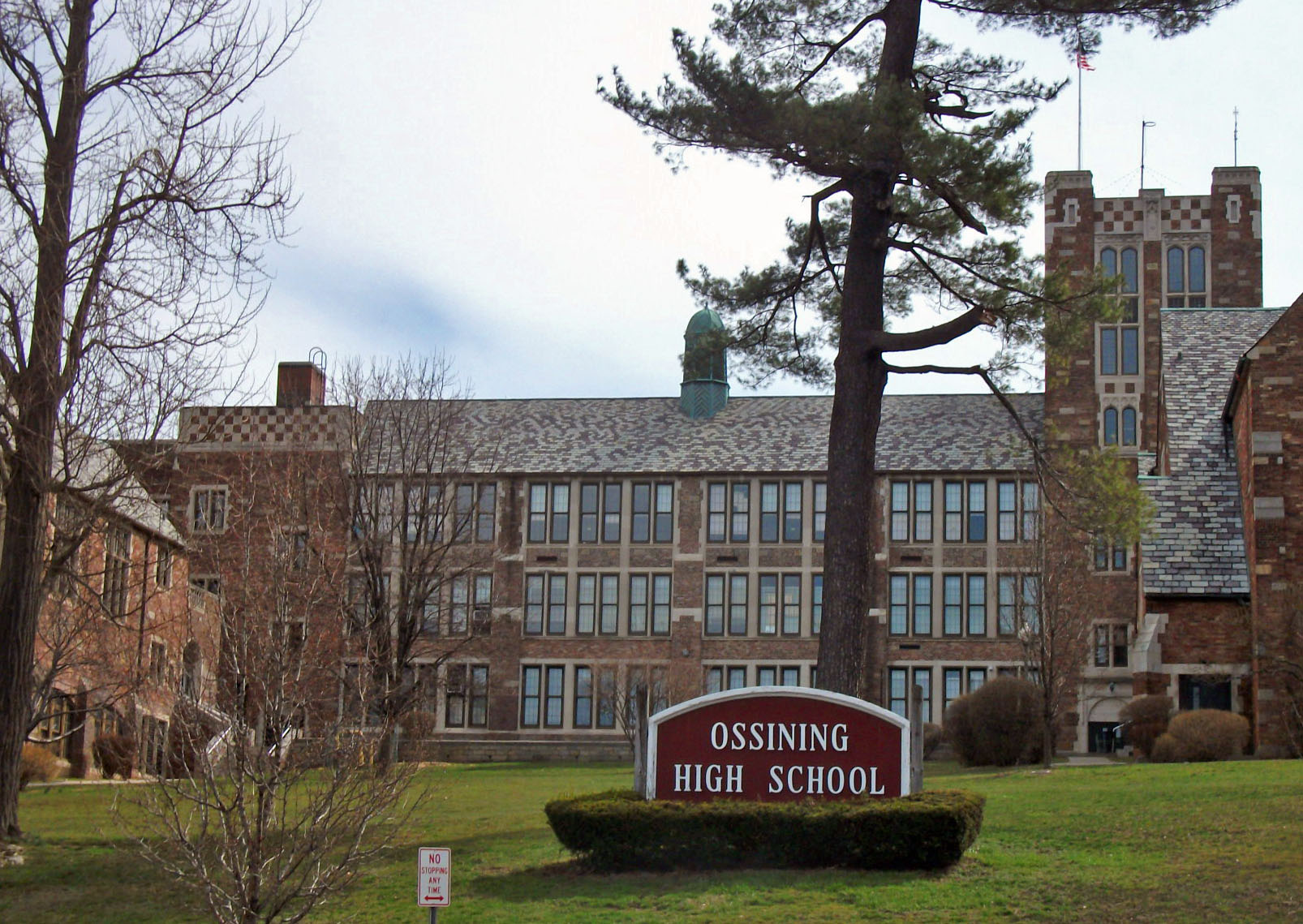
- West elevation, 2010
- 29 South Highland Avenue; Ossining, New York 10562; United States

Information
- Type: Comprehensive public high school
- School district: Ossining Union Free School District
- Principal: LaToya Langley
- Staff: 129.14 (FTE)
- Grades: 9-12
- Enrollment: 1,598 (2023-2024)
- Student to teacher ratio: 12.37
- Colors: Maroon and white
- Athletics conference: Section 1 (NYSPHSAA)
- Website: ohs.ossiningufsd.org

Ossining High School (OHS) is a comprehensive public high school located in Ossining, along the Hudson River in northern Westchester County, New York, United States. Serving grades 9 through 12, it is the sole high school within the Ossining Union Free School District. The school serves the entirety of the village of Ossining and portions of the Village of Briarcliff Manor, the Town of Ossining, and the Town of New Castle, as well as a very small southern portion of the Town of Yorktown.

Its building is a historical contributing property within the Downtown Ossining Historic District, which was added to the U.S. National Register of Historic Places in 1989.

== History ==
The present Ossining High School building was designed by James Gamble Rogers in a Collegiate Gothic style, with a warm-toned blend of brick and stone. Construction began in 1928 and was finished the following year; the school was built to replace the smaller Washington School (Ossining, New York), which then became an elementary school for the district. The school was built by Rafael Paiva. The school building has been substantially enlarged in the years since.

Between 1968 and 1974, the town of Ossining experienced a string of four race-related disturbances. The final one, on March 13, 1974, began in the school's cafeteria and resulted in several days of school closure, 15 student suspensions, and 19 injuries (including one to a school administrator); a student at the time recalls being locked in a biology classroom for hours, and a curfew for Ossining was implemented for days as a result. This disturbance took place just days after the district's announcement of a plan to redraw elementary school boundaries; at the time, one elementary school was over 60 percent Black, while two others were under 10 percent Black. Many believed this elementary school segregation to be an underlying cause of these racial disturbances. This eventually resulted in the implementation of the "Ossining Plan" for elementary school desegregation in 1981, which assigned each elementary school within the district by grade level instead of neighborhood.

== Service area ==
The district that operates the high school includes sections of the towns of Ossining and New Castle. Included within the portions of the school district in Ossining Town are Ossining Village and a section of Briarcliff Manor. About 28% of Briarcliff Manor is in the Ossining District, including Chilmark.

== Academics ==
Ossining High School has 9 periods, each 41 minutes long. A normal school day begins at 8:04 am and ends at 2:45 pm. The school offers optional extra help time from 2:45-3:15 pm. Classes run on an A/B day schedule, so that days alternate, and some electives or labs may occur every other day. The school operates an open campus for students above the ninth grade; these students are allowed to leave school supervision during school hours, and often take advantage of food establishments in surrounding Downtown Ossining.

The school's current full-time principal is LaToya Langley, the school's two full-time assistant principals are Jordan Barbach, and Jennifer Quiros. The school also offers eight Guidance Counselors, Kevin Brooks, Harold Corporan, Madeline Tineo Cuddy, Veronica Galindo Delgado, Jalay Knowles, Laura Montoya-Uribe, Kendall Murray McFarlane, Kenny Taveras divided via a house system.

Enrollment by ethnicity (2016–2017)
Ethnicity	Number	Percent
Black or African American	191	13.4
Hispanic or Latino	774	54.2
Asian or Native Hawaiian / Other Pacific Islander	57	4.0
White	377	26.4
Multiracial	28	2.0

Enrollment by gender (2016–2017)
Gender	Number	Percent
Male	736	51.6
Female	691	48.4

Post-Graduation Plans of Completers (2017):
Plan	Number	Percent
To Four-Year College	166	58
To Two-Year College	87	30
To Other Post-Secondary	2	1
To Military	6	2
To Employment	21	7
To Adult Services	3	1
To Other/Unknown	3	1

=== Enrollment ===
As of the 2016–2017 school year, the school had an enrollment of 1,378 students and 97.8 classroom teachers (on an FTE basis), for a student–teacher ratio of 14:1. 135 students (9%) were classified as English Language Learners, 217 (15%) were classified as Students with Disabilities, and 775 (54%) were Economically Disadvantaged. The school graduation rate in 2016 was 76%. Roughly half of the student population is Hispanic or Latino, with large White and Black minorities and a smaller Asian minority.

=== Awards ===
In 2012, OHS was named a School of Distinction finalist by Intel in the High School Science category; of those schools, it also received the top "Star Innovator" award from the company. The award, only one of which was granted annually, came with a prize of $100,000. The award recognizes K–12 schools that "provide a rich, rigorous science or mathematics curriculum by incorporating hands-on investigative experiences that prepare students for future jobs." OHS was recognized on the basis of the success of its long-running Science Research program, as well as the surprising success of the school's robotics program, founded that year. In 2016, the school was named a "School of Opportunity" by the National Education Policy Center (NEPC) for its efforts in closing the achievement gap. OHS has also been recognized by the Middle States Association of Colleges and Schools as a School of Distinction for its programs in music, school counseling, and world languages.

=== Classes ===
As of the 2018–2019 school year, Ossining High School offers 41 college-level classes, mainly in partnership with the University at Albany, SUNY (SUNY) and Westchester Community College (WCC), although a few are also offered in partnership with Iona College (New York), SUNY at Oneonta, and Syracuse University. Labeled the "SUNY Early College Program," they allow OHS students who plan to attend SUNY or WCC schools to complete a significant portion of their college curriculum at OHS. A notable SUNY class offered is "SUNY Racism, Classism, and Sexism," started in 2005 with the intention of drawing more nonwhite students to advanced courses; it has achieved success in doing so, although more rigorous AP classes are still disproportionately White.

The school also offers 14 Advanced Placement classes, which include AP English Language and Composition, English Literature and Composition, Spanish Language and Culture, Studio Art levels 1 and 2, U.S. History, U.S. Government and Politics, World History, Biology, Environmental Science, Calculus AB and BC, Computer Science, and Statistics. For the 2014–2015 school year, 38% of 12th-graders took at least one AP exam at any point during high school, and 57% of AP exams taken were passed (received a score of 3 or higher).

OHS offers foreign language classes in Spanish, French, and Italian, as well as American Sign Language classes.

9% of the OHS student population were English Language Learners in 2017, and the school has received acclaim from the National Education Policy Center (NEPC) for its academic programs to help this population. These students are taught using an Integrated Co-Teaching Model, in which an English as a New Language Teacher and a content area teacher collaborate to teach and aid ELL students participating in full English-language classes. In addition, OHS runs an Emergent Literacy Program for students with interrupted education or low literacy skills. The school has also been noted by NEPC for its co-taught classes for students with disabilities, in which these students are similarly aided by the collaboration of a special education teacher and content area teacher.

The school offers specialized vocational education instruction through the Putnam/Northern Westchester Board of Cooperative Educational Services (PNW BOCES) in Yorktown Heights, New York; interested eleventh- and twelfth-graders can complete some vocational courses for high school credit within a two-hour class at the BOCES Tech Center.

=== Science Research Program ===
Science teacher Angelo Piccirillo started OHS's science research program in 1998 with three students. Twelve years later it had 90 students, with Piccirillo and a second teacher, Valerie Holmes, working on the science research full-time. The program includes guidance on research topics, mentors, and help with writing papers and presenting them. It accepts approximately 30 freshmen yearly out of more than 100 applicants. The science research program was nationally recognized in 2012, when it had eight semifinalists in the Intel Science Talent Search, more than any other program in the country. Since 2001, this program has produced 94 STS semi-finalist scholars and 8 finalists.

== Extracurricular activities ==
=== Athletics ===
Ossining High School offers a wide variety of sports throughout the school year, ranging from modified to junior varsity to varsity levels. Physical education (PE) is a requirement for all students to attend each semester. However, sophomores, juniors, and seniors who are on varsity teams are exempt from PE class while the sport is in season.

These sport teams are open to all genders, though some are more dominated by a single sex:

- Baseball (predominantly male)
- Cheerleading (predominantly female)
- Cross country
- Field hockey (predominantly female)
- Football (predominantly male)
- Golf
- Gymnastics (predominantly female)
- Ice hockey (predominantly male)
- Softball (predominantly female)
- Track
- Volleyball (predominantly female)
- Wrestling (predominantly male)

Exclusive girls' and boys' teams exist for the following sports:

- Basketball
- Lacrosse
- Soccer
- Swimming
- Tennis

=== Musical Arts ===
Ossining High School is also known for performances in music, including an Orchestra, Chorus, Jazz Band, Concert Band, and Marching Band. Students involved in the marching band have in recent years taken part in a multitude of parades, including the Pearl Harbor Memorial Day Parade in Honolulu, Hawaii. Other performances include the Saint Patrick's Day parades in New York City and the village of Sleepy Hollow, the Ossining memorial day parade, and an annual Winter and Spring concert.

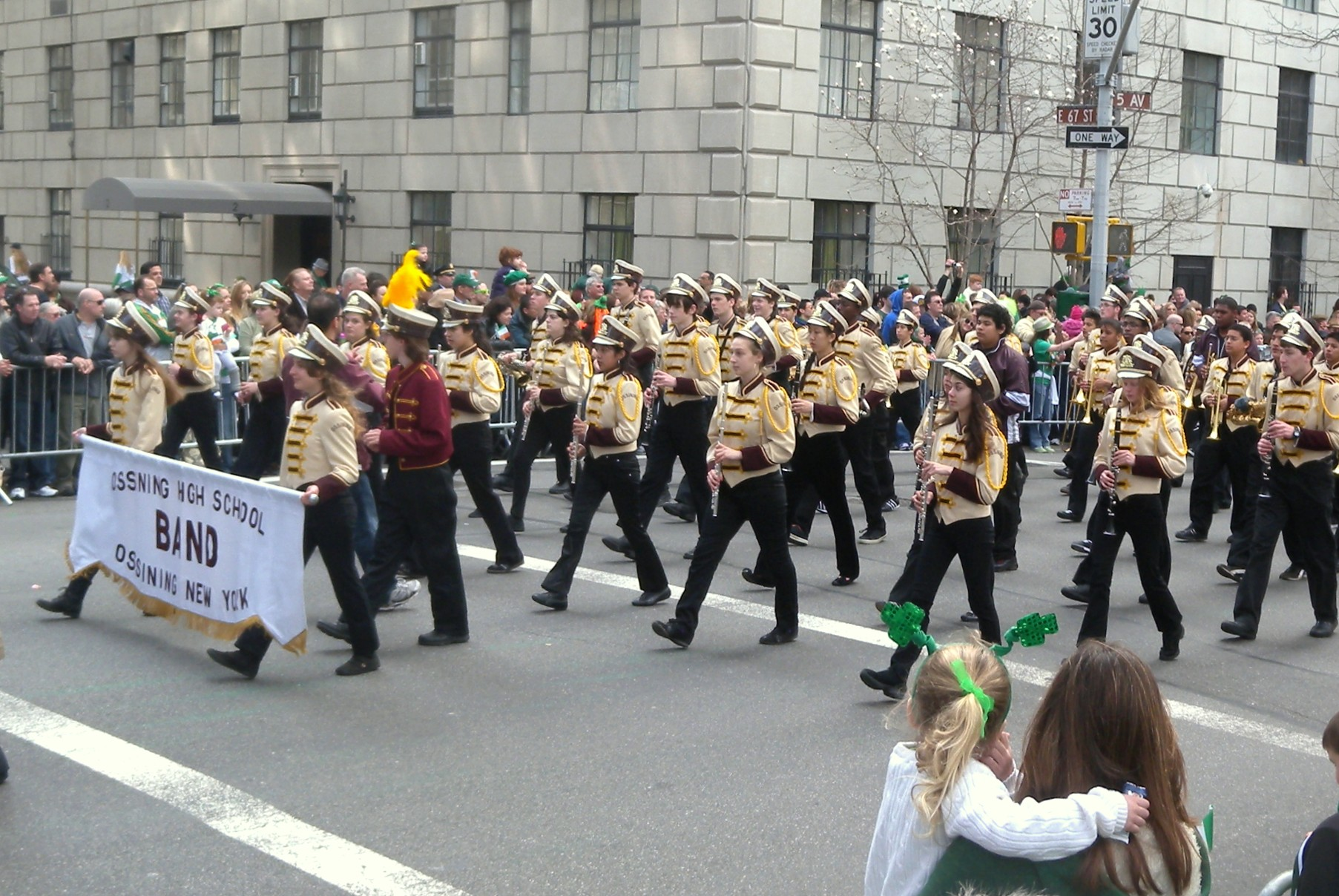
Band, marching in Manhattan

=== Mascot ===
For 73 years, Ossining teams were the "Ossining Indians." In June 2002, the school changed its mascot after a request from the state education commissioner. The request to change American Indian symbols and mascots was part of the Native American mascot controversy. A new mascot, the Riverhawk, was then chosen. After opposition from the student body, the Riverhawk was dropped. The school's athletic teams were then called the Ossining Pride. Ossining put in efforts to reach an agreement on a new mascot with the student body and community population, and on June 5, 2024, the school adopted its new mascot: the Lion.

== Notable alumni ==
- Harry L. Twaddle (Class of 1905) – U.S. Army major general
- Peter Falk (Class of 1945) – actor, best known for his role as Lt. Columbo in the television series Columbo
- Ken Buck (Class of 1977) – former U.S. representative from Colorado
- Martha Quinn (Class of 1977) – cable television and radio personality
- Dan Coudreaut (Class of 1983) – former executive chef at McDonald's
- Ken Horton (Class of 2007) – professional basketball player
- Saniya Chong (Class of 2013) – former UConn, NYSPHSAA state champion, (guard) WNBA player
- Jamie Loeb (Class of 2013) – NYSPHSAA state champion, Duke University tennis player
- Obi Toppin (Class of 2016) – Indiana Pacers forward
- Jacob Toppin (Class of 2018) – basketball forward in the Israeli Basketball Premier League, formerly in the NBA
- Aubrey Griffin (Class of 2019) – NYSPHSAA state champion & UConn basketball player
- AJ Griffin (AMD Middle School Class of 2017) – former Atlanta Hawks guard/forward
