= Ossining Union Free School District =

School district in the U.S. state of New York

Ossining Union Free School District is a school district headquartered in the Village of Ossining, Town of Ossining, New York.

The district includes sections of the towns of Ossining and New Castle. Included within the portions of the school district in Ossining Town are Ossining Village and a section of Briarcliff Manor. About 28% of Briarcliff Manor is in the Ossining District, including Chilmark.

As of 2026 Mary Fox-Alter is the superintendent.

== History ==
In 2017, after the development Snowden Woods was proposed by a developer, Sanchez stated that it would bring more students which would increase overcrowding in district schools.

== Schools ==
Secondary

- Ossining High School
- Anne M. Dorner Middle School

Elementary

- Claremont
- Brookside
- Roosevelt

Preschool

- Park Early Childhood Center
