= Crater Renaissance Academy =

Location
- 655 North 3rd St; Central Point, OR 97502; United States
- Coordinates: 42.380°N 122.921°W

Information
- Type: Public, secondary
- Motto: "Connect - Create - Change"
- Established: 2007
- Sister school: Crater Academy of Health & Public Services (CAHPS), Crater School of Business Innovation (BIS), & Crater Academy of Natural Sciences (CANS) (Closed 2012).
- School district: Central Point School District 6
- Principal: Jennifer Spencer (2022 - Present)
- Faculty: 23 (2016)
- Grades: 9–12
- Enrollment: 460 (2016)
- Mascot: Larry The Lawn Gnome
- Website: www.district6.org/cra/

Crater Renaissance Academy of Arts and Sciences is a public high school located in Jackson County, Oregon, United States. It is one of three public high schools in Oregon's School District 6, serving the Southern Oregon communities of Central Point, Gold Hill and Sams Valley.

== History ==
In 2007 Crater High School was reorganized through a program called the Small School Initiative. With assistance from the Bill and Melinda Gates Foundation and the Meyer Memorial Trust, four smaller, independent high schools were created: Crater Renaissance Academy (CRA), Crater Academy of Health and Public Services (CAHPS), Crater School of Business Innovation and Science (BIS), and the Crater Academy of Natural Sciences (CANS). While CANS was disbanded due to declining enrollment in 2012, the three remaining high schools, each with individual academic emphasis and culture, continue to serve the communities of Central Point, Gold Hill and Sams Valley.

Crater Renaissance Academy was acknowledged by U.S. News & World Report as among the Best High Schools in the United States (bronze award) in 2014, 2015, and 2016.

In 2015, a teacher, Jeffrey Robert Zundel, was arrested for sexual abuse of a student. An investigation resulted in criminal charges and he was sentenced to 90 days in prison. He had groomed the victim by telling her she was the reincarnation of his childhood girlfriend who had drowned, according to the Jackson County District Attorney's Office. Zundel was married to Medford School District Chief Academic Officer Michelle Zundel(now divorced).

In 2016, Crater Renaissance was one of eight schools in the nation to receive the gold award from the Schools of Opportunity. This award seeks "to recognize schools that are excellent because they engage in research-based practices that focus on closing gaps in opportunity, regardless of the students they serve."

Also in 2016, Crater Renaissance was one of four schools in Oregon selected by the Quality Education Commission to serve as a model site in its College Readiness Case Study Project.

Bob King served as principal from the school's inception in 2007 through the 2015-2016 school year.

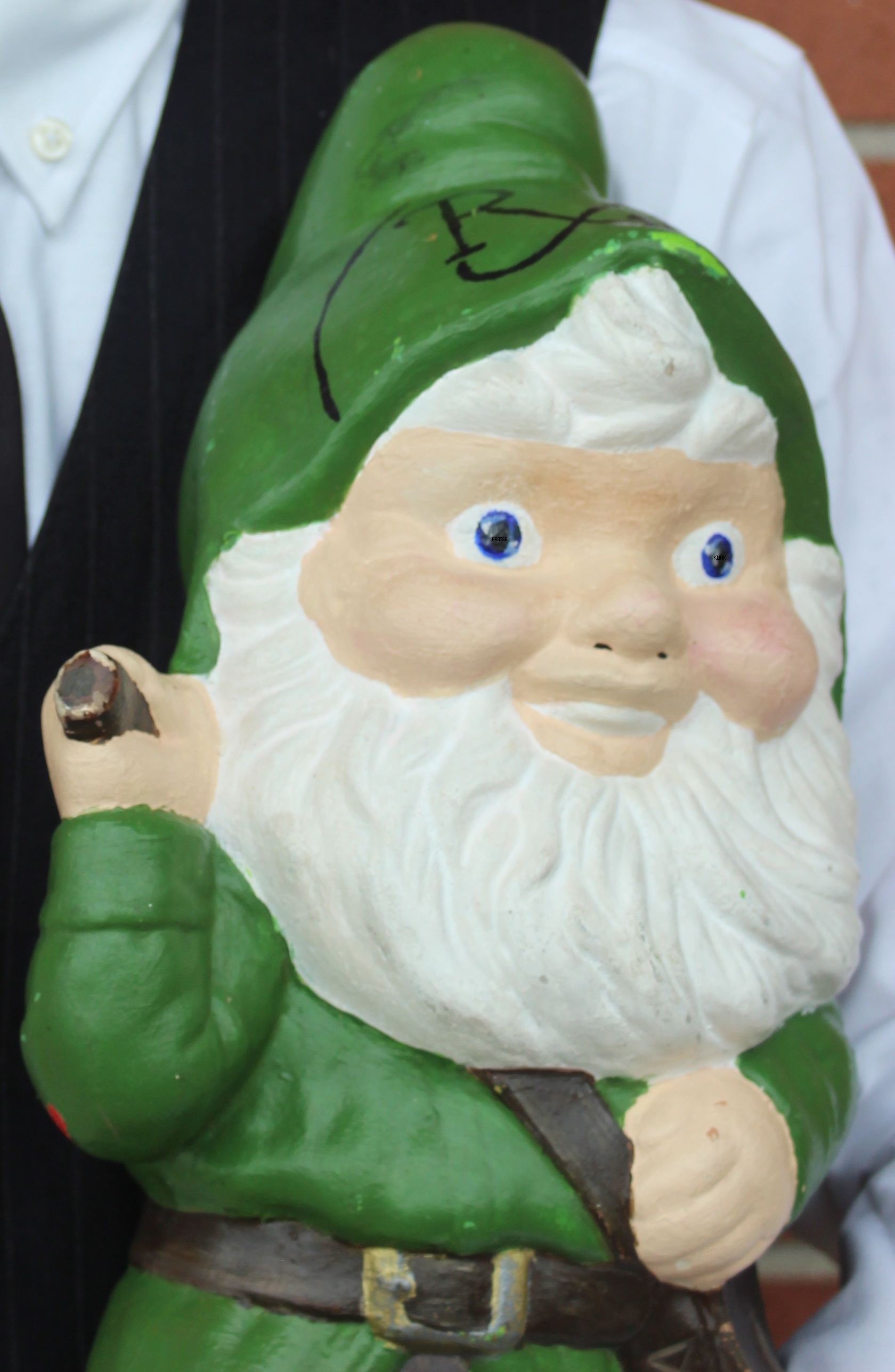
Larry The Lawn Gnome: Mascot of The Crater Renaissance Academy of Arts and Sciences

== Academics ==
Crater Renaissance Academy was founded on the principles of the Coalition of Essential Schools (CES), using its ten principles to guide its decisions.

== Campus and facilities ==
Crater Renaissance Academy shares Crater Campus with two other small schools: Crater Academy of Health and Public Service, and Crater School of Business, Innovation, and Science. The campus includes a gym, football field and stadium, greenhouse facilities, Performing Arts Center, and an off-site environmental classroom.

== Athletics and activities ==
Crater Renaissance Academy and its sister schools compete together in Oregon School Activities Association (OSAA) events as the "Crater Comets." This includes the football, volleyball, soccer, cross country, wrestling, basketball, swim, track, and cheer teams, and the Marching Band and Color Guard.
