= Centaurus High School =

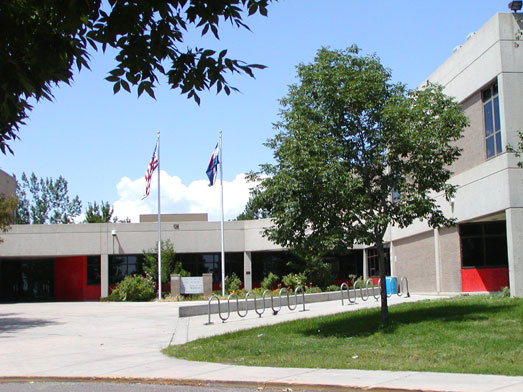
- Front entrance in 2007

Location
- 10300 South Boulder Road; Lafayette, Colorado 80026; United States; 39°59′10″N 105°6′45″W

Information
- School type: Public high school
- Established: 1971 (55 years ago)
- School district: Boulder Valley RE-2
- CEEB code: 060865
- NCES School ID: 080249000107
- Principal: Carlyn Carroll
- Teaching staff: 77.56 (on an FTE basis)
- Grades: 9–12
- Enrollment: 1,561 (2023–2024)
- Student to teacher ratio: 20.13
- Colors: Royal blue, red, white
- Athletics conference: CHSAA
- Mascot: Warrior
- Newspaper: The Warrior Scroll
- Yearbook: The Iliad
- Website: ceh.bvsd.org

Centaurus High School (CHS) is a public secondary school in Lafayette, Colorado, United States, serving students in grades nine through twelve. It is part of the Boulder Valley School District and is a School of Opportunity. It offers International Baccalaureate, Advanced Placement, AVID and engineering programs.

== Description ==
Centaurus High School is located in a racially and socioeconomically diverse suburban community between Boulder and Denver. It had an enrollment of 1,482 students in the 2020–2021 school year, with 39% minority enrollment (majority Hispanic), lower than the state average enrollment of 48% minority enrollment. Approximately 35% of the students at CHS are economically disadvantaged.

Curricular offerings include an Engineering Academy, an International Baccalaureate Diploma program, Advanced Placement courses, and fine arts.

In 2015, CHS received national attention for its "package of reforms designed to create a school community that is welcoming and caring as well as academically challenging and supportive". As one of the Schools of Opportunity, Centaurus provides support for incoming ninth grade students, including "social and academic supports, hands-on learning, and extracurricular opportunities". A support program, AVID (Advancement Via Individual Determination), serves students with potential for college success, but whose families may be economically disadvantaged or whose parents may not have graduated from college.

In Schools of Opportunity, "Practices include effective student and faculty support systems, outreach to the community, health and psychological support, judicious and fair discipline policies, high-quality teacher induction and mentoring programs, and limiting or eliminating tracking and ability grouping."

According to Carol Burris and Kevin Weiner, who wrote the first report on the CHS Schools of Opportunity project,

Many incoming students not brought into the AVID program instead participate in "July Warriors," which is a summer enrichment program that focuses on engaging students in reading, math, and science. The program uses interactive, hands-on learning opportunities that culminate with weekly trips and other life experiences that take place outside school. While students are developing these skills, they are building relationships with peers and teachers that will be important over the next four years.

Students at CHS have also joined students and staff at University of Colorado Boulder to create an elective ethnic studies course. Students wanted to explore other cultures, including their dance, food and the arts. Researcher have correlated ethnic studies courses with better attendance, graduation rates and academic performance.

== History ==
The CHS building was constructed in 1974. By 2014, it was in need of major repairs to the HVAC system, the roof, the cafeteria, lighting, restrooms and tennis courts. In November of that year Boulder Valley School District voters passed a $576.5 million bond issue for renovations to district schools. Construction of a CHS addition, renovations, and the school's Spangenberg athletic complex were completed between June 2017 and September 2018, at a total cost of $25.2 million.

== Extra-curricular activities ==
=== Athletic state championships ===
==== Boys ====
- Wrestling – 1992, 1995, 1996, 1999
- Cross Country – 2012, 2018(video, 1:49 minutes)

==== Girls ====
- Basketball – 1991

=== Music state championships ===
- Marching Band – 2012, 2013, 2014, 2015, 2016, 2023
- Winter Percussion – 2019, 2021, 2022

== Notable alumni ==
- Devon Beitzel – basketball player, Northern Colorado
- Hilary Cruz - beauty pageant contestant and 2006 Miss Colorado Teen USA
- Jack D. Fischer – astronaut
- Derrick Goold – writer, St. Louis Post-Dispatch
- Malinda Lo – writer, New York Times bestselling author and 2021 National Book Award winner
- John Massaro (born John Hazlett) – musician
