= Carol Corbett Burris =

American educator, born 1953

- Born: Carol Ann Corbett; 1953 (age 71–72)
- Education: Ed.D., Teachers College, Columbia University, 2003
- Occupation: Educator
- Organization: Network for Public Education Foundation
- Title: Executive Director

Carol Corbett Burris (born 1953) is an American educator, administrator, and author. From 2000–2015 she was principal of South Side High School in Rockville Centre, New York. Opposed to the Common Core curriculum, Burris has been an advocate of "detracking" the secondary school curriculum, not only to allow all students access and support in International Baccalaureate courses, but also to desegregate classrooms where minority students have not been given opportunities to succeed with a more challenging curriculum. She resigned in 2015, a protest over the "reforms that eat away at the moral fabric of our schools". Burris then became Executive director of the Network for Public Education.

== Early life and education ==
Burris earned a Ed.D. at Teachers College, Columbia University in 2003, with a dissertation titled, Providing accelerated mathematics to heterogeneously grouped middle school students: The longitudinal effects on students of differing initial achievement levels, sponsored by Jay P. Heubert.

== Career ==
In her early career, Burris served ten years on a school board, taught middle school and high school Spanish, and was vice principal of South Side High School in Rockville Centre, New York. From 2000 to 2015 Burris served as the principal at South Side.

In a 2007 article in Educational Leadership, Burris challenged the current pedagogy that limited the more challenging courses to schools' highest-achieving students, asking, "What would happen if all students were encouraged to enroll in the most rigorous classes available?" Advocating "detracking" students to allow participation of all in International Baccalaureate (IB) courses at South Side High School, Burris identified cultural and institutional barriers for minority students "to take the risk of signing up for the rigorous IB classes". Teachers also appealed to student interests to encourage enrollment in IB classes, and the IB coordinator held work sessions with every tenth grade student, explaining the advantages of achieving IB diploma requirements. Burris reported a follow-up study of graduates, concluding, "Of the 86 percent who were contacted, 90 percent of students who took IB English and IB math graduated from college in four years, compared with 34 percent of those who did not take either course."

A 2008 Brookings Institution document, the Brown Center Report on American Education led by Tom Loveless, found "that the nation's push to challenge more students by placing them in advanced math classes in eighth grade has had unintended and damaging consequences, as some 120,000 middle-schoolers are now struggling in advanced classes for which they are woefully unprepared". Burris objected to the Loveless report's conclusion: "A brief overview of the experience with eighth-grade algebra for all in the district where the reviewer works yields findings consistent with the report's call for better math preparation but inconsistent with its call for fewer to take algebra in eighth grade." Burris offered "a brief overview of a research study of a successful program in which all students, including low achievers, take algebra in eighth grade". However, Gerald Bracey pointed out that in the Lovelace study's student sample "...average NAEP score for the misplaced 8th graders was 211, compared to the national average score of 4th graders of 238". Bracey also objected to the unequal achievement data, which was not a normal distribution in the Rockville group, and concluded, "The kids in Rockville Center are not the kids in Loveless' study. Not by a long shot. We're comparing incomparables."

Burris wrote an open letter in 2011 to U.S. Secretary of Education Arne Duncan, describing the punitive teacher evaluation policies tied to standardized testing in effect in New York. Burris also vocally opposed a new system of teacher evaluations, portrayed by the state Education Department as "teachers and principals completing construction of an airplane in midair presumably to show the excitement of a challenging mission".

In 2015 Burris became an ardent opponent of Common Core standards, arguing that the Core testing harms disadvantaged students, writing that "high stakes testing – using tests for student promotion, teacher evolution, and even school closure – has certainly increased the controversy surrounding the Common Core". She also targeted teacher evaluations based on students' scores on Common Core tests, writing, "We know this will result in increased teaching to the test and a curriculum that narrows to those Common Core standards that are tested. In districts and states that chose to rely heavily on test scores in their evaluations, that has been the observed outcome." Burris resigned as the principal at South Side, concluding, "I cannot be part of reforms that eat away at the moral fabric of our schools..." In August 2015, she became Executive director of the Network for Public Education.

Burris has consistently criticized charter schools, and supported "more accountability and transparency that should be required for any taxpayer-funded programs". The Network for Public Education "chronicled for-profit tactics, charter school scandals and how the federal grant program disbursed millions to schools that never opened or closed". She argues that for-profit charter schools use damaging cost-cutting strategies:

Of greatest concern, however, are the cost-cutting, service diminishing strategies used by for-profits to maximize their bottom line, like these:

- Circumventing state rules for qualified educators by designating their uncertified and inexperienced teachers as "permanent substitutes"
- Limiting the number of special needs students permitted to attend
- Overcrowding classroom settings, especially online.One online charter operator had a student-teacher ratio of 275-to-1.11
- Instituting policies and practices intended to discriminate against or exclude students who are expensive to teach

— Carol Corbett Burris

== Selected publications ==
=== Books ===
- Burris, Carol Corbett; Garrity, Delia T. (2008). Detracking for Excellence and Equity. ASCD. ISBN 978-1-4166-0708-3.
- Burris, Carol Corbett; Garrity, Delia T. (2012). Opening the Common Core: How to Bring ALL Students to College and Career Readiness. Corwin Press. ISBN 978-1-4522-7740-0. Review
- Burris, Carol Corbett (2014). On the Same Track: How Schools Can Join the Twenty-First-Century Struggle against Resegregation. Beacon Press. ISBN 978-0-8070-3297-8. Reviews

=== Articles ===
- Burris, C. C., & Welner, K. G. (2005). Closing the achievement gap by detracking. Phi Delta Kappan, 86(8), 594-598.
- Burris, C. C., Heubert, J. P., & Levin, H. M. (2006). Accelerating mathematics achievement using heterogeneous grouping. American Educational Research Journal, 43(1), 137-154.
- Welner, K., & Burris, C. C. (2006). Alternative approaches to the politics of detracking. Theory into Practice, 45(1), 90-99.
- Burris, C. C., Welner, E. W. K., & Murphy, J. (2008). Accountability, rigor, and detracking: Achievement effects of embracing a challenging curriculum as a universal good for all students. Teachers College Record, 110(3), 571-607.
- Burris, Carol C.; Welner, Kevin G.; Bezoza, Jennifer W. (December 2009). "Universal Access to a Quality Education". studylib.net.
- Corbett Burris, Carol; Welner, Kevin; Weiser Bezoza, Jennifer (February 1, 2010). "Universal Access to Quality Education: Research and Recommendations for the Elimination of Curricular Stratification". PRRAC — Connecting Research to Advocacy.
- Wellner, Kevin G.; Corbett Burris, Carol (February 19, 2010). "Tracking sends too many offtrack". Newsday. pp. A37.
- Burris, Carol Corbett (January 25, 2012). "Using Test Scores to Evaluate Teachers Is Based on the Wrong Values". The New York Times. Archived from the original on January 28, 2012.
- Burris, Carol Corbett; Bryant, Jeff (April 15, 2019). "Asleep at the Wheel: How the Federal Charter Schools Program Recklessly Takes Taxpayers and Students for a Ride". Network For Public Education.
- Burris, Carol Corbett (2021). "Public Education at a Crossroads". In Berliner, David C.; Hermanns, Carl (eds.). Public Education: Defending a Cornerstone of American Democracy. Teachers College Press. pp. 235–286. ISBN 978-0-8077-6609-5.

=== Awards, honors ===
- 2003 – National Association of Secondary Schools' Principals Middle Level Dissertation of the Year Award
- 2010 – Named Educator of the Year by the School Administrators Association of New York State (SAANYS)
- 2013 – Named SAANYS New York State High School Principal of the Year

== See also ==
- Schools of Opportunity
- Tracking (education)
