= Peak to Peak Charter School =

Charter school in Colorado, US

Coordinates: 39°59′27.88″N 105°4′45.07″W

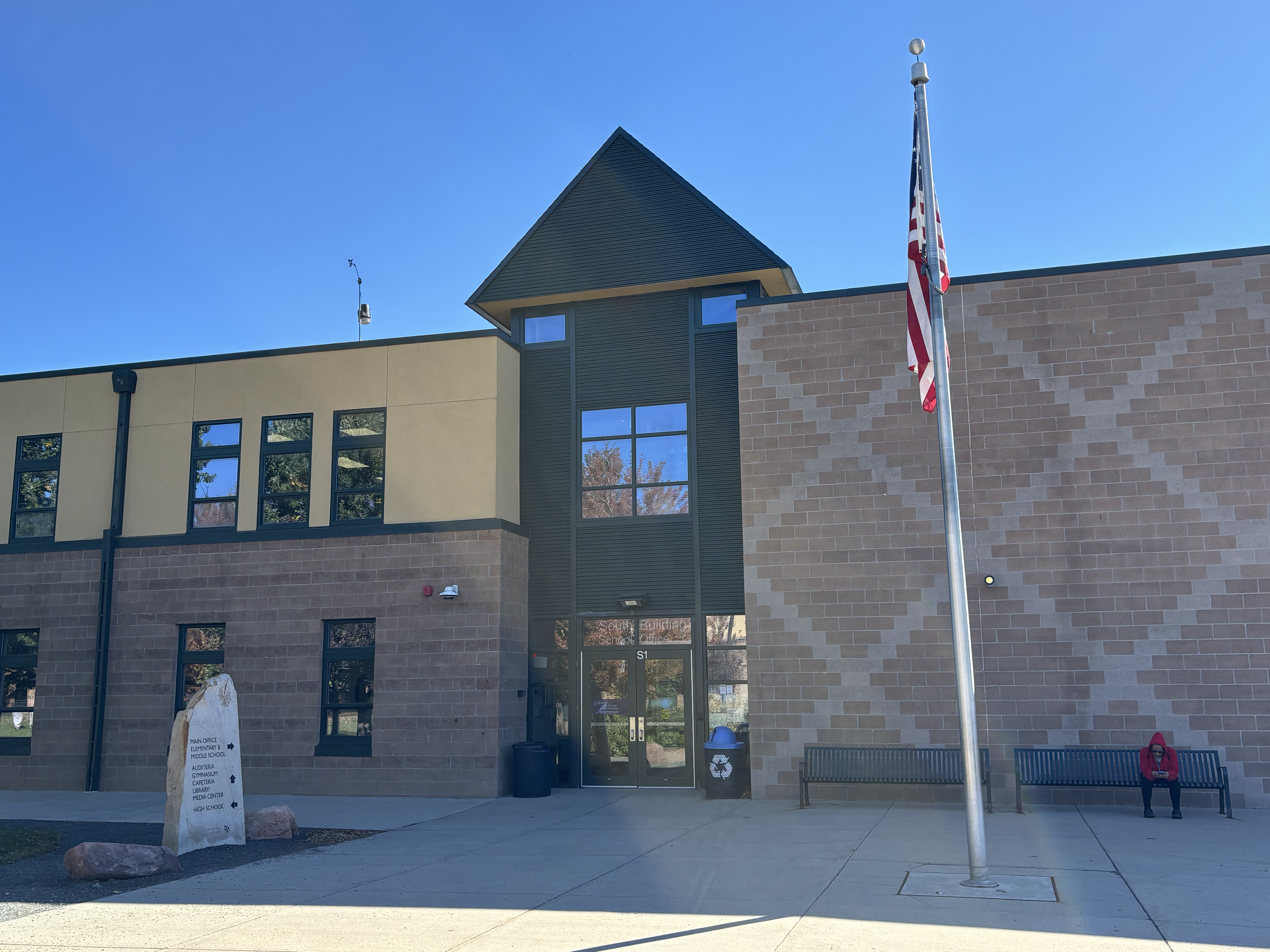
- Close view of the elementary office entrance at Peak to Peak Charter School in Lafayette, Colorado, showing the gabled entry tower, patterned CMU facade, flagpole, and bench seating.

Location
- 800 Merlin Drive; Lafayette, Colorado 80026; United States

Information
- Type: Charter school
- Established: 1999 (27 years ago)
- School district: Boulder Valley School District (BVSD)
- CEEB code: 060869
- Principal: Melissa Christensen (elementary); Clara Quinlan (middle); Joshua Benson (high)
- Teaching staff: 78.47 (on an FTE basis)
- Grades: K-12
- Enrollment: 1,452 (2023–2024)
- Student to teacher ratio: 18.50
- Colors: Black, blue, gray, and white
- Athletics: Soccer, baseball, golf, volleyball, basketball, cross country, track and field, softball, tennis
- Mascot: Puma
- Newspaper: PawPrint 5
- Website: www.peaktopeak.org

Peak to Peak Charter School is a K–12 public charter school in Lafayette, Colorado, offering a liberal-arts, college-preparatory curriculum. Founded in 1999, it operates within the Boulder Valley School District and serves roughly 1,400–1,500 students. The school is regularly highly ranked in state and national high-school lists and offers a wide Advanced Placement program and various extracurricular activities, including athletics. Peak to Peak is accredited by the Colorado Department of Education.

== History ==
=== Origins and charter approval (1997–1999) ===
Peak to Peak began as a parent-led effort in late 1997 to create a K–12, college-preparatory charter option within the Boulder Valley School District (BVSD). A group of roughly a dozen parents and community members drafted the original charter proposal, consulting with faculty from public and private colleges and educators from several BVSD choice schools. The proposal was submitted to BVSD on 26 May 1998 and was approved by the BVSD school board in August 1998. After further negotiations concerning budget and facilities, Peak to Peak's charter contract with BVSD was officially approved by the district board on 13 May 1999 (board vote 5–2).

=== Opening and early years (2000–2002) ===
Although the charter contract was approved in 1999, the school initially struggled to find a permanent facility. After a series of site attempts, Peak to Peak leased and renovated a former daycare center in Lafayette and opened for its first day of classes on 4 September 2000. To accommodate rapid enrollment growth, the school operated on multiple temporary sites and used modular classrooms while pursuing a permanent campus site.

=== Merlin Drive campus and financing (2001) ===
In 2001, Peak to Peak purchased a 26-acre site on Merlin Drive in Lafayette for its permanent campus. Financing for construction was secured through the sale of an $18.8 million bond on 26 July 2001; the school's issue was notable because Peak to Peak was one of the earliest charter schools to sell bonds so soon after opening. The permanent campus construction was completed in the early 2000s and the Merlin Drive campus became the school's long-term home.

=== Growth and recognitions (2003–2015) ===
Peak to Peak's academic performance earned the school multiple statewide recognitions, including several John Irwin School of Excellence awards. The school also received regional and national rankings: Peak to Peak was recognized in Newsweek's and U.S. News & World Report's national high school rankings in the 2000s (for example, being listed among Newsweek's Top 100 in 2008).

=== Campus expansions and facilities improvements (2000s–2010s) ===
To address increasing enrollment and program needs, the Merlin Drive campus was expanded in phases. Major campus additions included a new gymnasium and cafeteria and multiple two-story classroom additions serving the middle and high school; these projects were delivered as part of BVSD/Peak to Peak construction phases and documented in district bond project materials and contractor project pages.

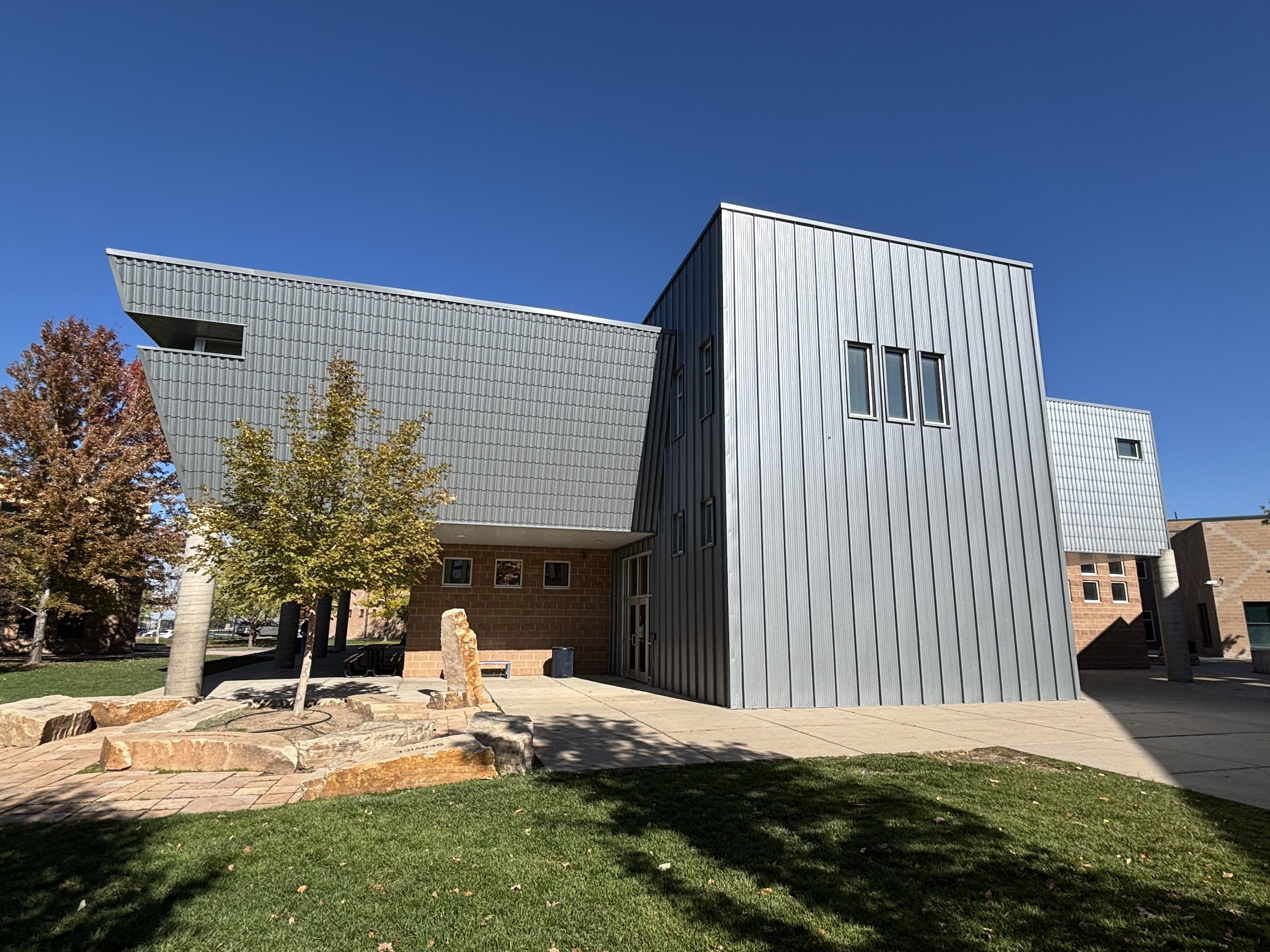
South and west facades of the Library Media Center at Peak to Peak Charter School in Lafayette, Colorado, featuring angular metal-clad volumes, clerestory windows, and a landscaped stone seating area.

=== Contract renewal and governance (2015–present) ===
Peak to Peak negotiated a ten-year contract renewal with BVSD in 2015 (a shift from prior five-year renewals), which secured funding arrangements, particularly for special education services, and allowed longer-range program planning. The school's board and leadership periodically negotiate subsequent renewals with BVSD under Colorado's charter school framework.

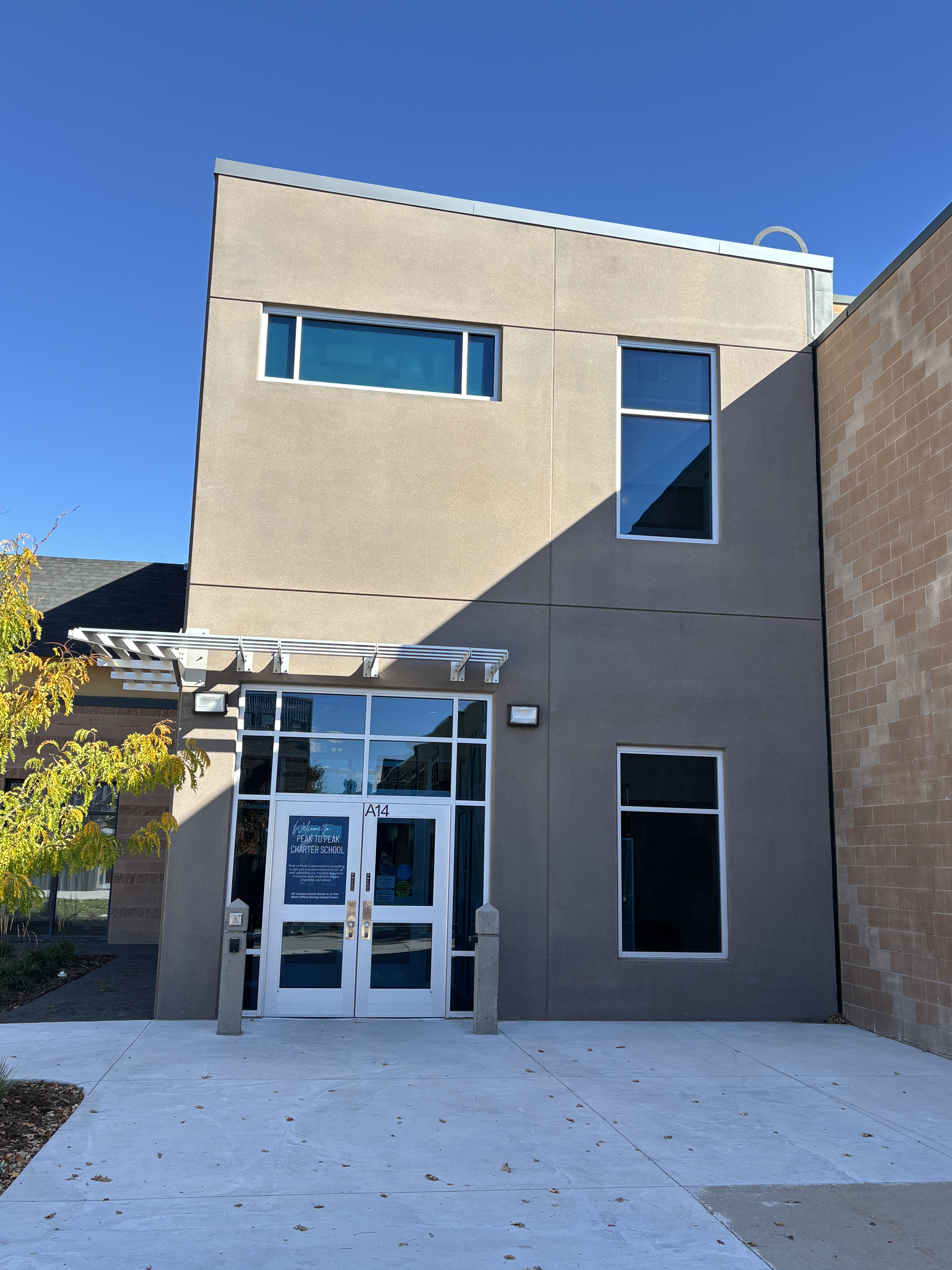
Entrance to the new auditorium at Peak to Peak Charter School in Lafayette, Colorado, showing the A14 doorway with glass vestibule, stucco facade, and a small metal canopy.

== Academics ==
Peak to Peak Charter School provides a rigorous academic program emphasizing college preparation, high expectations, and opportunities for advanced coursework.

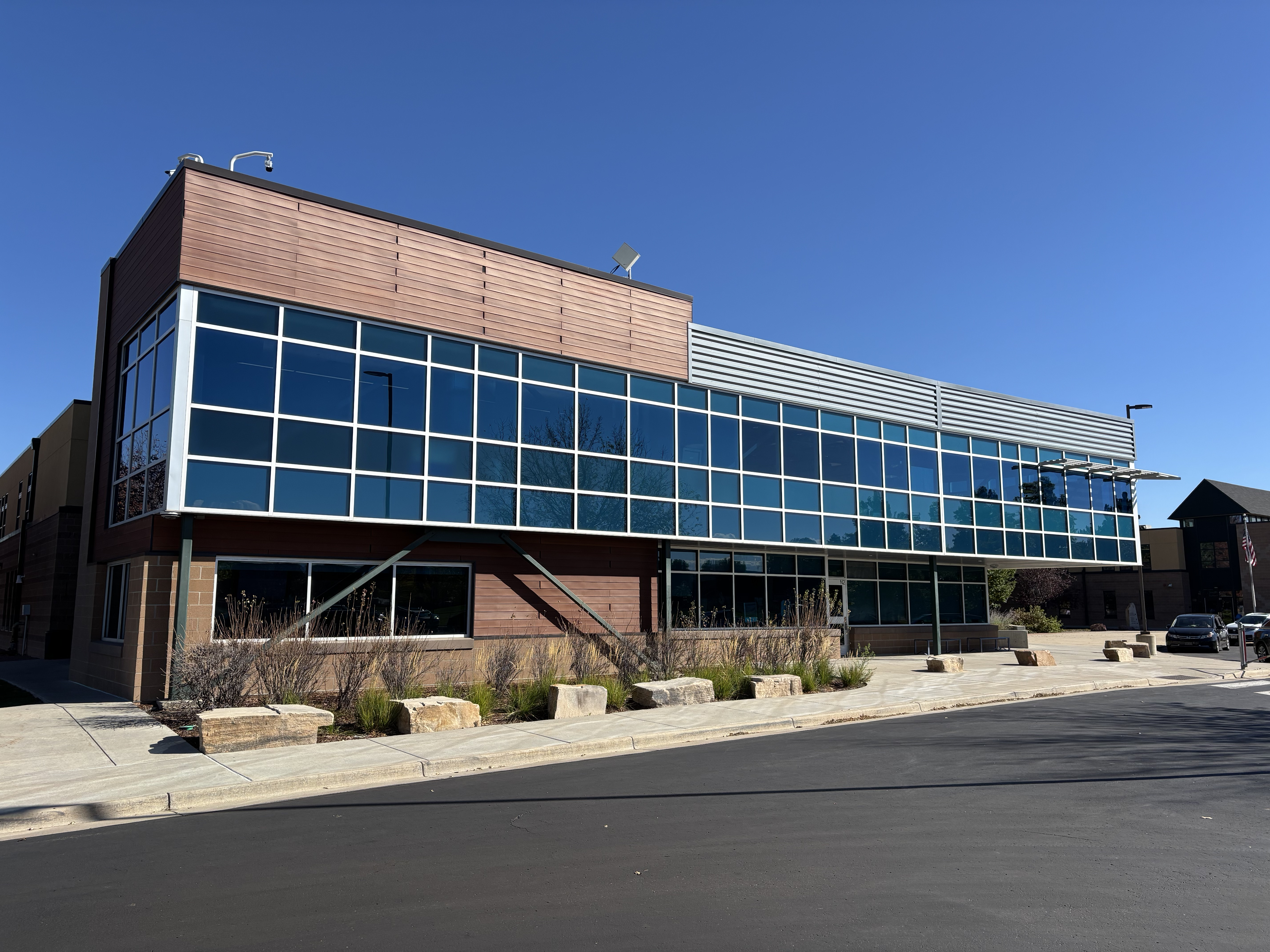
Northwest corner of the high school counseling/classroom wing at Peak to Peak Charter School in Lafayette, Colorado, with a projecting glass curtain wall, wood-look cladding, and landscaped seating along the sidewalk.

=== Advanced Placement (AP) and College-credit Options ===
Peak to Peak offers 20 Advanced Placement (AP) courses in subjects including art, English, mathematics (Calculus AB & BC, Statistics), science (Biology, Chemistry, Physics, Environmental Science), social studies, world languages (French, Spanish), computer science, and studio art. Students enrolled in AP courses are required to take the cumulative AP exam in May. In 2025, there were 459 students taking AP classes and 1,027 exams, with approximately 79% scoring a 3 or higher; in prior years, pass rates ranged from about 66% to 75%.

Concurrent enrollment is also offered, allowing students to take postsecondary courses to earn both high school and college credit, as part of their individualized career and academic plan.

=== Graduation, Testing, and Outcomes ===
Peak to Peak's graduation rate has been reported at 95–98%, significantly above the Colorado state average. Students perform above state averages on assessments: reading proficiency is about 67%, math proficiency around 55%, and science proficiency also relatively strong.

=== Support and Enrichment Programs ===
The school's Gifted and Talented (GT) program serves both middle and high school students. It offers Honors and AP level courses, supports such as mentoring, executive function development, enrichment, and accelerated learning when appropriate. Additional academic components include graduation requirements that involve a Capstone project, options for industry certification, and oversight via the Individual Career and Academic Plan (ICAP).

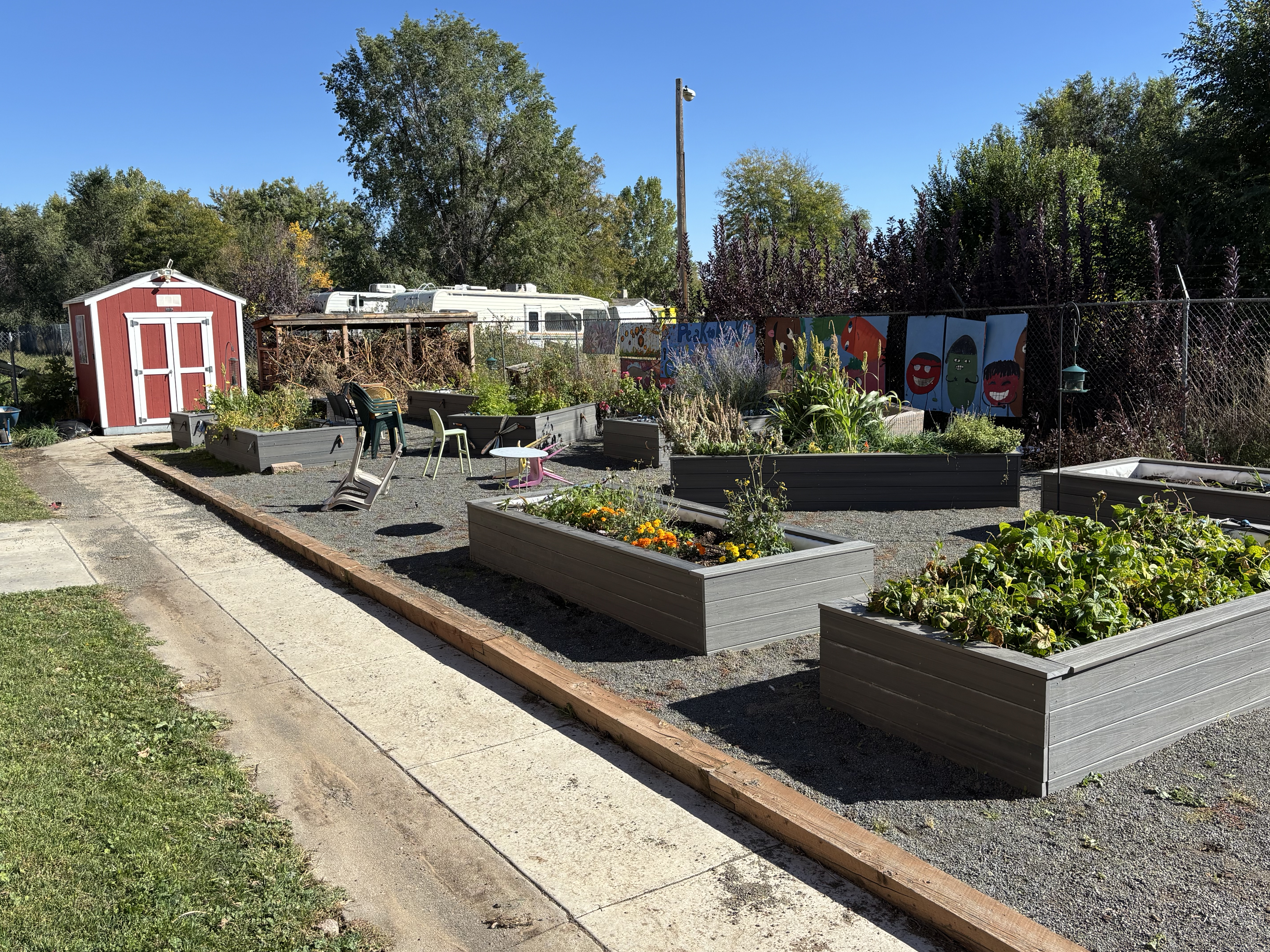
Educational garden at Peak to Peak Charter School in Lafayette, Colorado, featuring composite-raised beds with flowers and vegetables, a red storage shed, and a student-painted mural along the fence.

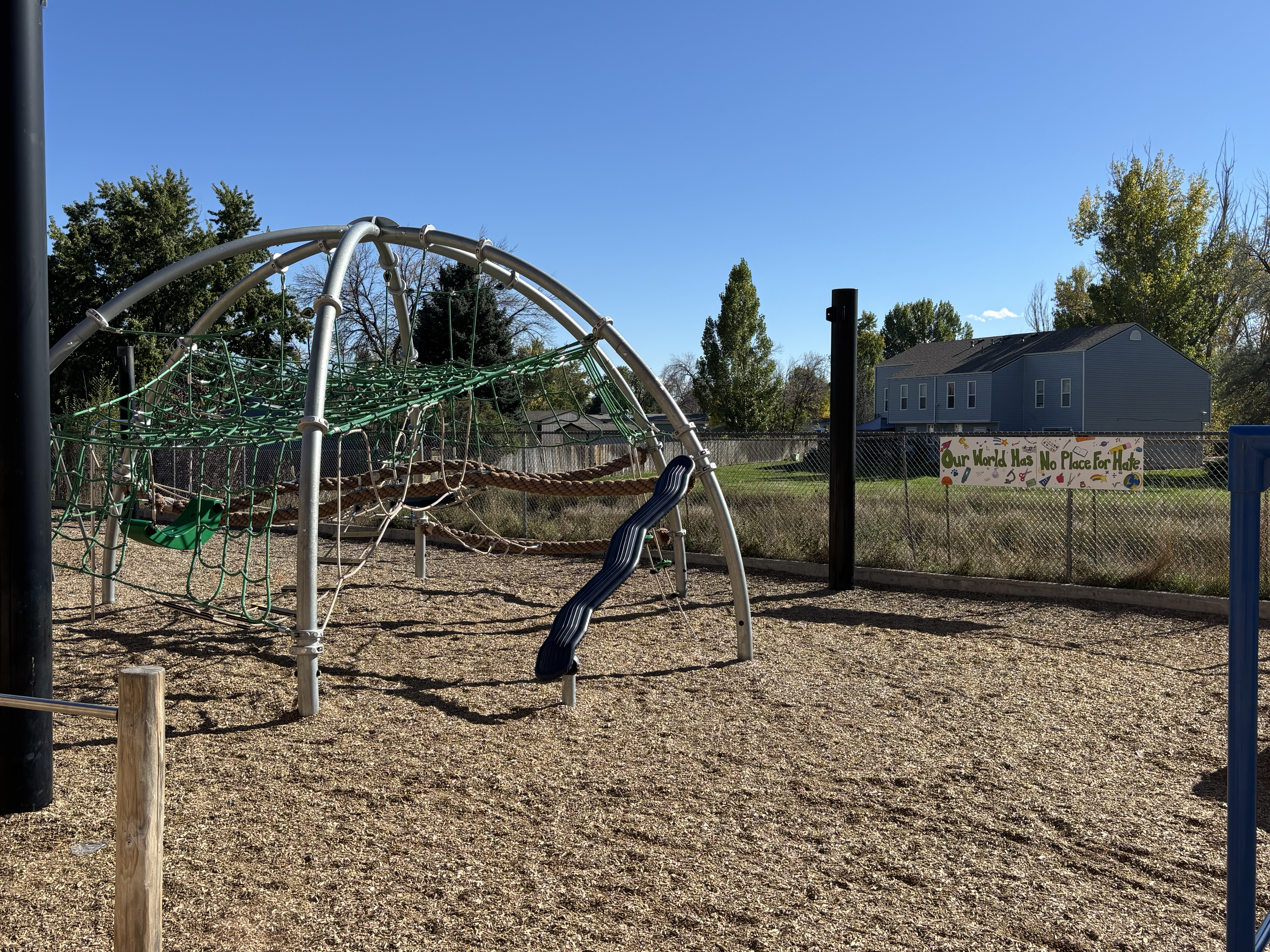
Elementary playground at Peak to Peak Charter School in Lafayette, Colorado, featuring a domed rope-climbing structure with slide over wood-fiber surfacing and a fence banner reading “Our World Has No Place for Hate.”

== Accreditation and Recognitions ==
Peak to Peak Charter School is accredited by the Colorado Department of Education (CDE) and operates under the Boulder Valley School District. The school has consistently received high performance ratings from the CDE, reflecting its commitment to educational excellence.

Nationally, Peak to Peak has earned several accolades:

- U.S. News & World Report ranked the school 210th nationally and 6th in Colorado in its 2022 "Best High Schools" rankings
- The school has been recognized with the John Irwin School of Excellence Award multiple times, an honor given to schools that demonstrate exceptional academic performance
- In 2024, Boulder Valley School District, which oversees Peak to Peak, was the only Denver Metro district to receive the Accredited with Distinction rating from the CDE, indicating a high level of educational quality

== Athletics and Extracurriculars ==
Peak to Peak Charter School offers a comprehensive athletic program for students in grades 6–12, competing primarily in the Colorado High School Activities Association (CHSAA) 3A classification. The school provides a range of sports, including:

- Fall Sports: Cross Country, Boys Golf, Boys Soccer, Softball, Boys Tennis, Girls Volleyball
- Winter Sports: Boys Basketball, Girls Basketball
- Spring Sports: Track and Field, Baseball, Girls Golf, Girls Soccer, Girls Tennis

These programs are detailed on the school's official athletic calendar.

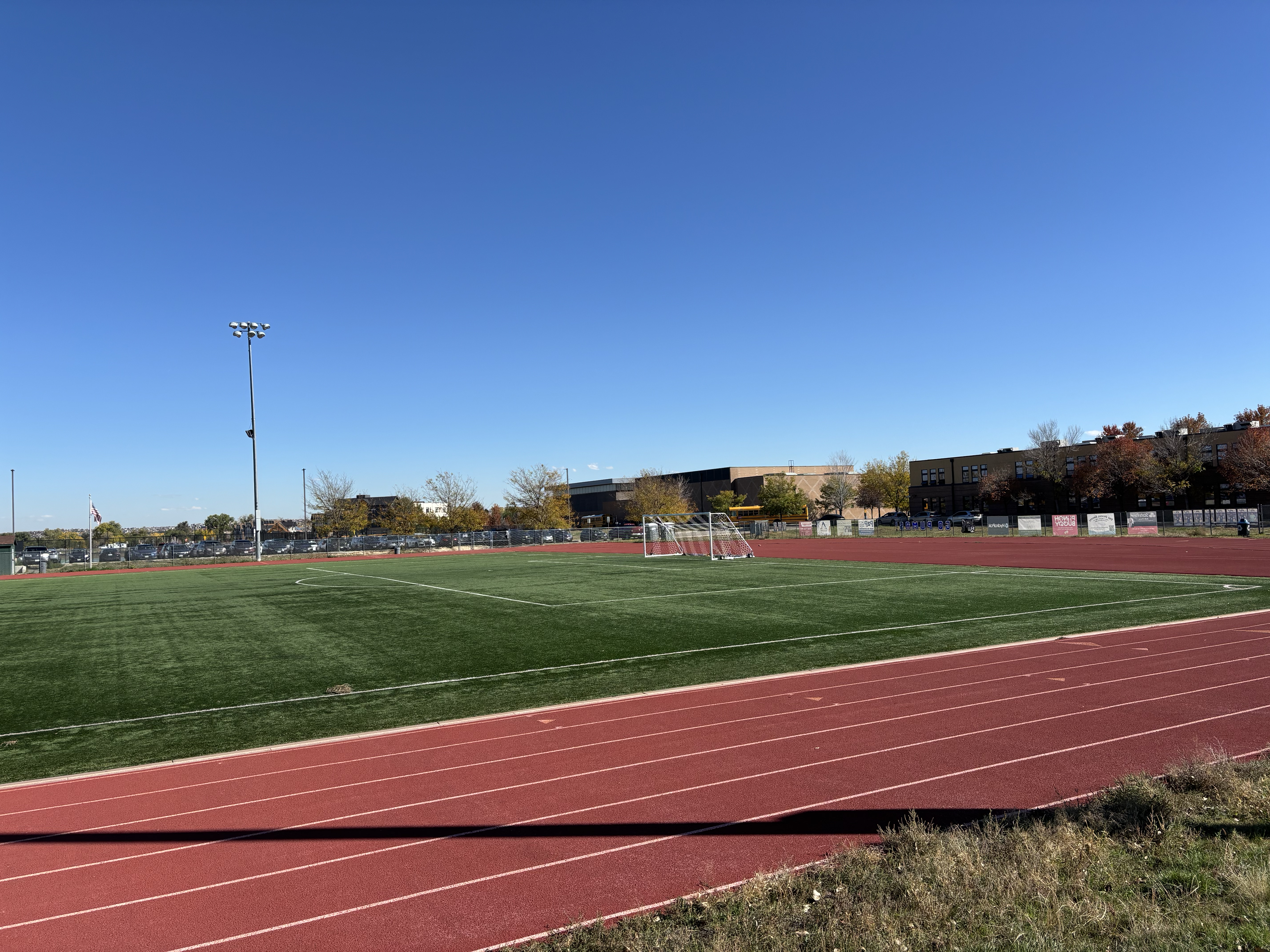
View of the synthetic-turf soccer field and red oval running track at Peak to Peak Charter School in Lafayette, Colorado, with movable goals and field lights under a clear sky.

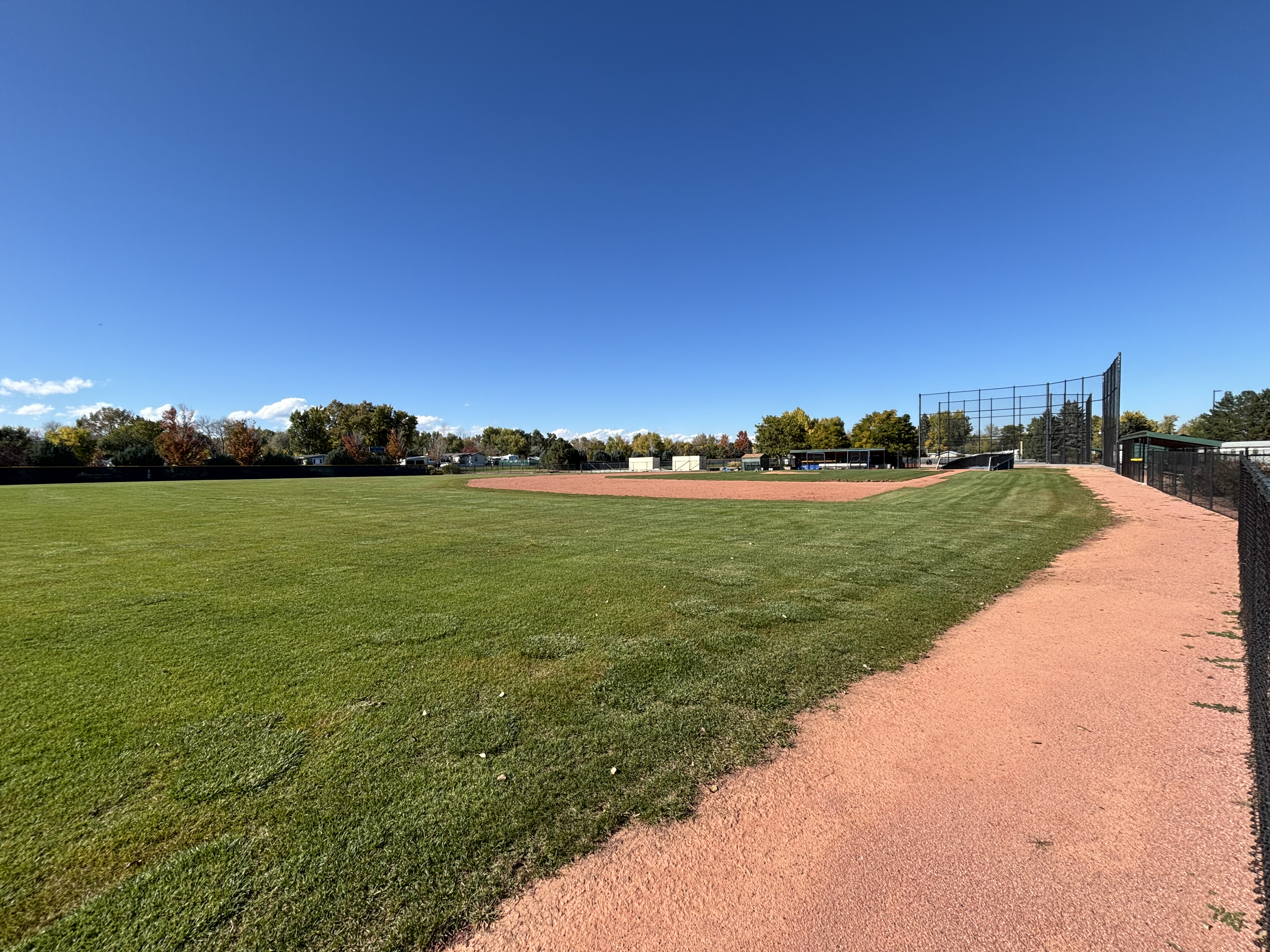
Wide view of the Peak to Peak Charter School softball/baseball field in Lafayette, Colorado, showing the outfield grass, warning track, and backstop under a clear autumn sky.

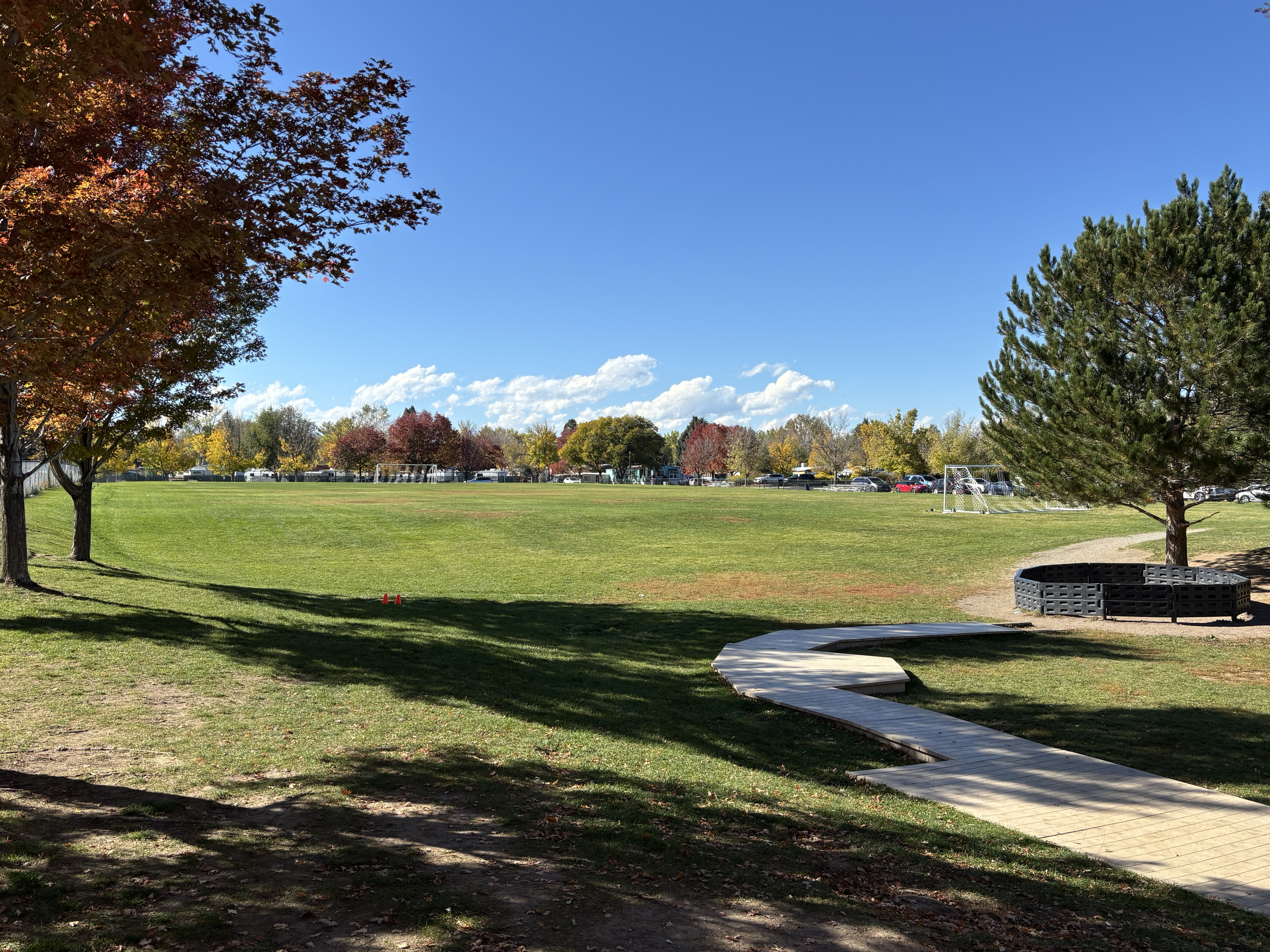
Wide view of the central grass field at Peak to Peak Charter School in Lafayette, Colorado, showing perimeter trees in fall color, portable soccer goals, and a curved gabion-seat amphitheater at right.

=== Notable Achievements ===
- 2023–24: In tennis, Molly Kollachov and Josie Adams secured the 3A state championship in #2 doubles, marking a significant achievement for the school's athletic program.
- 2025: The boys basketball team advanced to the Class 4A state tournament, showcasing the program's competitive spirit.
- Peak to Peak's track and field athletes consistently demonstrate strong performances at the CHSAA state championships, with notable results in various events. In 2026, Ethan Rathke, set the current 3A pole vault state record with a mark of 16 feet 10 inches. Anna Shults and Quinn McConnell were four time 4x800 meter relay state champions from 2016-2019. In 2021, Allison Beasley won the 3200m 3A state title, and Aidan Graziano won the 3A 110m hurdles state title.
- 2024–25: Alexandra Eschmeyer, a 2025 graduate, was a standout player, earning two-time Boulder Daily Camera Girls Basketball Player of the Year honors (2024, 2025) and scoring 2,066 points, ranking 7th all-time in Colorado state history. She was also named to the McDonald's All-American team and the Jordan Brand Classic roster and selected for the Nike Hoop Summit Team USA roster. That same season, the Peak to Peak girls basketball team advanced to the Class 4A state tournament, defeating Denver West 51–28 in the first round before losing 47–41 to D'Evelyn in the quarterfinals.
- 2024-2025: Gavin Keogh, a 2025 graduate, was named the Boulder Daily Camera Boys Swimmer of the Year. His performances during the 2024-2025 competitive season, including a bronze medal in the 100m backstroke and a silver medal on the Mixed 4x100 Medley Relay at the World Aquatics Junior Swimming Championships, earned him a team selection to the USA National Team in the 100m backstroke.

== Controversies and Incidents ==
=== Lunch Account Funds Practices (2013-2014) ===
During the 2013–2014 school year, Peak to Peak Charter School ended the practice of cafeteria staff stamping students' hands to indicate low or empty lunch accounts. The school attributed this practice to a software issue that prevented staff from identifying students eligible for the free and reduced lunch program, leading to some students mistakenly receiving stamps. The school acknowledged the incident as a "grievous mistake" and resolved the software issue promptly. Additionally, "the school immediately stopped the past practice of hand stamping, and the software issue was fixed. This activity took place during the first few weeks of the 2013-14 school year."

== Demographics ==
The demographic breakdown of the 1,447 students in the 2024–2025 school year:

- American Indian/Alaska Native: 0.21%
- Asian: 23.29%
- Hawaiian Native/Pacific Islander: 0.21%
- Hispanic: 12.79%
- Black: 0.76%
- White: 55.7%
- Two or more races: 6.98%

(Percentages may not add to 100% due to rounding)
