= Boulder High School =

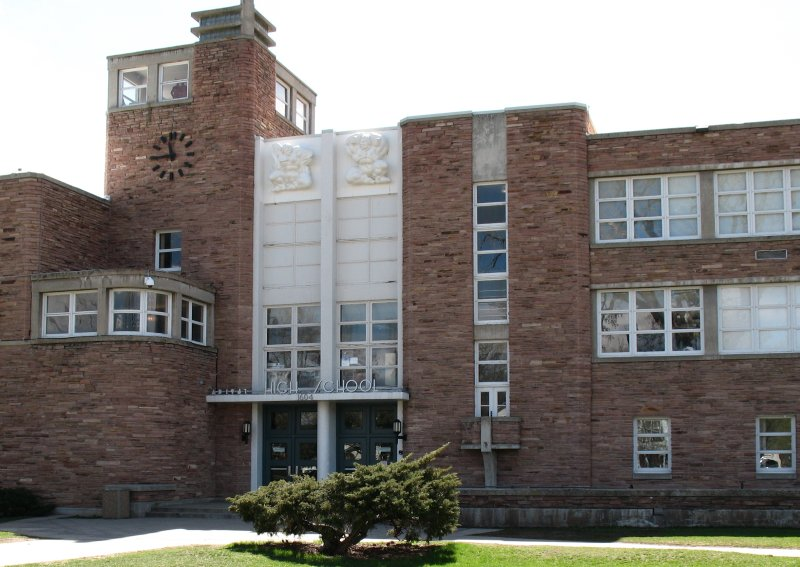
- Front entrance

Location
- 1604 Arapahoe Avenue; Boulder, Colorado 80302; United States; 40°0′49″N 105°16′26″W

Information
- Type: Public
- Motto: "A Place For Everyone"
- Established: 1875 (151 years ago)
- School district: Boulder Valley
- Superintendent: Rob Anderson
- CEEB code: 060115
- Principal: Dr. Kristen Lewis
- Teaching staff: 99.05 (FTE)
- Grades: 9–12
- Enrollment: 2,022 (2023–2024)
- Student to teacher ratio: 20.41
- Colors: Purple and gold
- Athletics: CHSAA 5A Front Range League
- Nickname: Panthers
- Website: boh.bvsd.org

Boulder High School is a high school in Boulder, Colorado, United States. It is part of the Boulder Valley School District.

Boulder High School was founded in 1875 as a preparatory school for the University of Colorado. In 1876, it was the first high school in Colorado to graduate a class. The school is located in downtown Boulder, across Boulder Creek from the university’s campus and four blocks from the Pearl Street Mall.

== Construction ==
Boulder High School's building at 1604 Arapahoe Avenue was constructed in 1933 by the Works Project Administration. The facade is classic Streamline Moderne. The school's Art Deco auditorium has also been preserved. The building was constructed with "Colorado Red" flagstone and limestone, the same materials from which the University of Colorado is built. With funding from a Boulder Valley School District (BVSD) bond program, parts of the school were renovated or expanded in 2008. The changes include a remodeled ESL wing and counseling office, a new gymnasium, a larger administrative wing, and a bigger auditorium backstage. Most of the school's recent additions also have flagstone facades, but none retain the original Art Deco design.

=== Stadium ===
Boulder High football, soccer, lacrosse, and track teams compete at Christian Recht Field, accessed via a bridge spanning Boulder Creek. Recht Field received a multimillion-dollar upgrade in 2003, which included artificial turf installation to conserve water and reduce injuries caused by frozen turf during the winter. As part of the BVSD bond program, a visitors' field house was constructed at the west end of the field. A separate bond initiative launched in 2022 resulted in further renovations in Summer 2023. The turf on Recht field was replaced, and the access bridge leading to the stadium was repaired and repainted.

Fairview High School shares Recht Field for a number of varsity-level events. When Boulder and Fairview football compete against each other in the annual Boulder-Fairview duel, the schools' fans alternate use of the visitor and home stands each year.

=== Flood danger ===
Boulder High School is in the Boulder Creek flood zone. The school's adjacent soccer fields were the site of housing as late as the 1980s, but the houses were removed due to the flash-flood risk. The City of Boulder continues to remove residential buildings in the path of the most dangerous portions of the creek, replacing them with parks and fields. The Boulder Creek 100-year flood took place in 1894, destroying all buildings in the area. The 2013 Colorado floods caused the school to be closed for several days. The soccer fields flooded, as did the softball field, which was the most damaged.

== Attendance zone ==
The neighborhood attendance zone for Boulder High School includes the north and central portions of Boulder, and the mountain communities to the west of Boulder.

== Demographics ==
2012–2013 academic year
	Percent
Female	49
Male	51
Native American/Alaskan	0.4
Asian	5
Black/African-American	2
Hispanic/Latino	17
White/Caucasian	72
Two or more ethnicities	4
Free/reduced lunch	17
Reading proficient/advanced	78
Mathematics proficient/advanced	59

== Extracurricular activities ==
=== Athletics ===
Boulder High School is a 5A member of the Colorado High School Activities Association's (CHSAA) Front Range league and a former member of CHSAA's Centennial League (1964–2008). Boulder High School won a 6A state title in football in 1992, and also had state titles in 1943 and 1963. Boulder High School baseball has had some success as well, winning a state title in 1991.

In 2012, Boulder High School's varsity boys' soccer team won the Colorado 5A Soccer Championship, beating Smoky Hill in the final game at Dick's Sporting Goods Park. After 14 rounds of penalty kicks, Boulder High earned its second Boys Soccer 5A State Championship in 2016 with a win over Broomfield High School and a perfect 20-0 season. The 2016 Panthers finished the season ranked second in the nation by USA Today on its Super 25 Expert Rankings.

==== History ====
In October 2007, to make competition locations more convenient for athletes and parents, BHS and crosstown rival Fairview petitioned to leave for the more accessible Front Range League. The request was approved in January 2008 and took effect at the start of the 2008–2009 school year.

==== Varsity sports ====
Boulder High fields nineteen different varsity sports teams each year across three seasons.

Fall

- Cross country
- Football
- Boys' golf
- Boys' soccer
- Girls' softball
- Boys' tennis
- Girls' volleyball

Winter

- Boys' basketball
- Girls' basketball
- Girls' swimming
- Wrestling

Spring

- Baseball
- Girls' golf
- Boys' volleyball
- Boys' lacrosse
- Girls' lacrosse
- Girls' soccer
- Boys' swimming
- Girls' tennis
- Track and field

==== Intramural and club sports ====
In addition to its varsity sports, Boulder High School has a wide array of intramural and club sports.

- Badminton
- Basketball
- Cheerleading
- Cross-country skiing
- Dodgeball
- Kickball
- Mountain bike racing
- Pom squad
- Smash Club
- Ultimate

==== State championships ====
State championships
Sport	No. of championships	Year
Baseball	1	1991
Basketball, boys'	3	1946, 1977, 1979
Basketball, girls'	6	1984, 1986, 1989, 1990, 1991, 1994
Chess	1	1981
Cross country, boys'	2	1951, 1965
Football	3	1943, 1963, 1992
Mountain biking	9	2010, 2011, 2012, 2014, 2015, 2016, 2018, 2019, 2021, 2022
Soccer, boys'	2	2012, 2016
Softball	4	1987, 1988, 1990, 1991
Track & field, boys'	3	1910, 1911, 1943
Ultimate, girls'	2	2017, 2018
Volleyball	1	2000
Gymnastics, boys' (former)	1	1951

=== Panther TV ===
Boulder High students create a weekly broadcast, showing announcements and student-made content to the entire school.

=== The Owl ===
The Owl is Boulder High's student-run newspaper, founded in 1909. Started primarily as a club, the newspaper became a year-long class in the 2019-2020 school year.

=== Student Worker ===
In 1999, Boulder High students founded the political activist group Student Worker, which has carried out a number of demonstrations, including the January 2005 "sleep-in" protesting the war in Iraq and the May 2001 "kiss-in" supporting alternative sexuality. In May 2005, Student Worker, in a partnership with Peace Jam, erected 1,650 miniature American flags in memory of soldiers killed in Iraq. In September 2007, the group protested the Pledge of Allegiance, citing an objection to the "one nation, under God" clause. They instead recited a revised version. This student group is no longer active.

== Scares and controversies ==
=== Safety scares ===
On May 10, 2007, a cafeteria worker reported seeing two masked men enter the school before class hours wearing camouflage and ski masks. Classes were subsequently canceled while the school was locked down and searched by police. After multiple inspections, nothing suspicious was found, and school returned to normal the next day.

Rumors that a song performed at a school talent show would include death threats to the president also garnered national attention, although a subsequent investigation indicated that the rumors were false.

Boulder High School has endured multiple false bomb threats in the past several years, prompting a moderate increase in school security.

On February 22, 2023, CU Boulder police received a call from an individual who claimed they were bringing semi-automatic weapons into the school. Boulder High School entered lockdown and the building was searched by police and K-9 units. No injuries or threats were discovered. Students and staff were evacuated to a nearby auditorium and class was cancelled for the remainder of the day.

=== Conference on World Affairs: 2007 ===
Each year, Boulder High hosts several panels of the University Of Colorado's Conference on World Affairs (CWA). The panels have been well attended by BHS students, have typically been supported by the faculty, and, despite a focus on politically sensitive issues, have caused little public controversy, with the exception of one on April 10, 2007.

The panel, entitled "STDs: Sex, Teens, and Drugs," was to debate the merits of teens' different attitudes toward sex and drugs. According to some, the views presented by panel member Dr. Joel Becker, an associate clinical professor of psychology at the University of California, Los Angeles, were too extreme. Becker allegedly encouraged students to have sex and use illegal drugs, told them where to easily find marijuana, and poked fun at condom use. Others argue that the objections were unfounded, and he was taken out of context. A transcript of the panel is available from BVSDWatch.org.

A Boulder High sophomore and her mother, Priscilla White, complained to the school board and protested some teachers' mandatory panel attendance policy. The board reviewed the case, but meanwhile, the complaint attracted the national media's attention. The panel was covered most prominently by Fox News commentator Bill O'Reilly and radio talk show hosts Don Caplis and Craig Silverman. In an attempt to refute O'Reilly's views, a group of students publicly demanded an apology and organized to defend the CWA panel and BHS administration.

The school board concluded on May 22 that the comments in question had been generally taken out of context and that the overall panel was appropriate for high school students. The school board also recognized that several statements were unnecessarily crude and recommended that, in the future, student attendance at the Conference on World Affairs be optional. Today, the CWA at Boulder High School is overseen by a committee to assure the school board's recommendations are carried out and to prevent a similar conflict from occurring again.

== Notable alumni ==
- Dick Anderson (born 1946, class of 1963), former NFL safety for the Miami Dolphins and former NFLPA president; All-American at Colorado
- Bobby Anderson (born 1947), former NFL halfback, All-American at Colorado (brother of Dick Anderson)
- Jello Biafra (born 1958 as Eric Boucher, class of 1976), lead singer of 70s punk-rock band Dead Kennedys
- Mike Bohn (born 1960), former athletic director at the University of Colorado
- Brian Bonsall (born 1981, class of 2000), actor and musician most known for Family Ties
- Scott Carpenter (1925–2013, class of 1943), Project Mercury astronaut, SEALAB aquanaut, test pilot
- Morgan Carroll (born 1971, class of 1990), Colorado State Senate 2009–2017; Colorado House 2005–2009
- Steve Ells (born 1966), founder and former CEO of the Chipotle restaurant chain
- Michael Goldenberg (born 1965), screenwriter and director
- Glen Gondrezick (August 30, 1955 – April 27, 2009), graduated 1973; UNLV (1973–1977)
- Tyler Haney co-founder of Outdoor Voices
- Hale Irwin (born 1945), former PGA golfer and current golf course architect; college football safety at Colorado
- Heath Irwin (born 1973), former NFL guard for the St. Louis Rams, All-American at Colorado (nephew of Hale Irwin)
- Nathaniel Motte (born 1984), singer in 3OH!3
- Davis Phinney (born 1959), professional cyclist
- Taylor Phinney (born 1990), professional cyclist (son of Davis Phinney)
- Rick Reilly (born 1958), columnist for ESPN, previously Sports Illustrated
- Gerry Roach (born 1943), mountaineer
- Chris Wood (born 1969), musician and member of Blue Note Records recording artists Medeski, Martin and Wood
- Francesca Woodman (1958–1981), photographer
