= Broomfield High School =

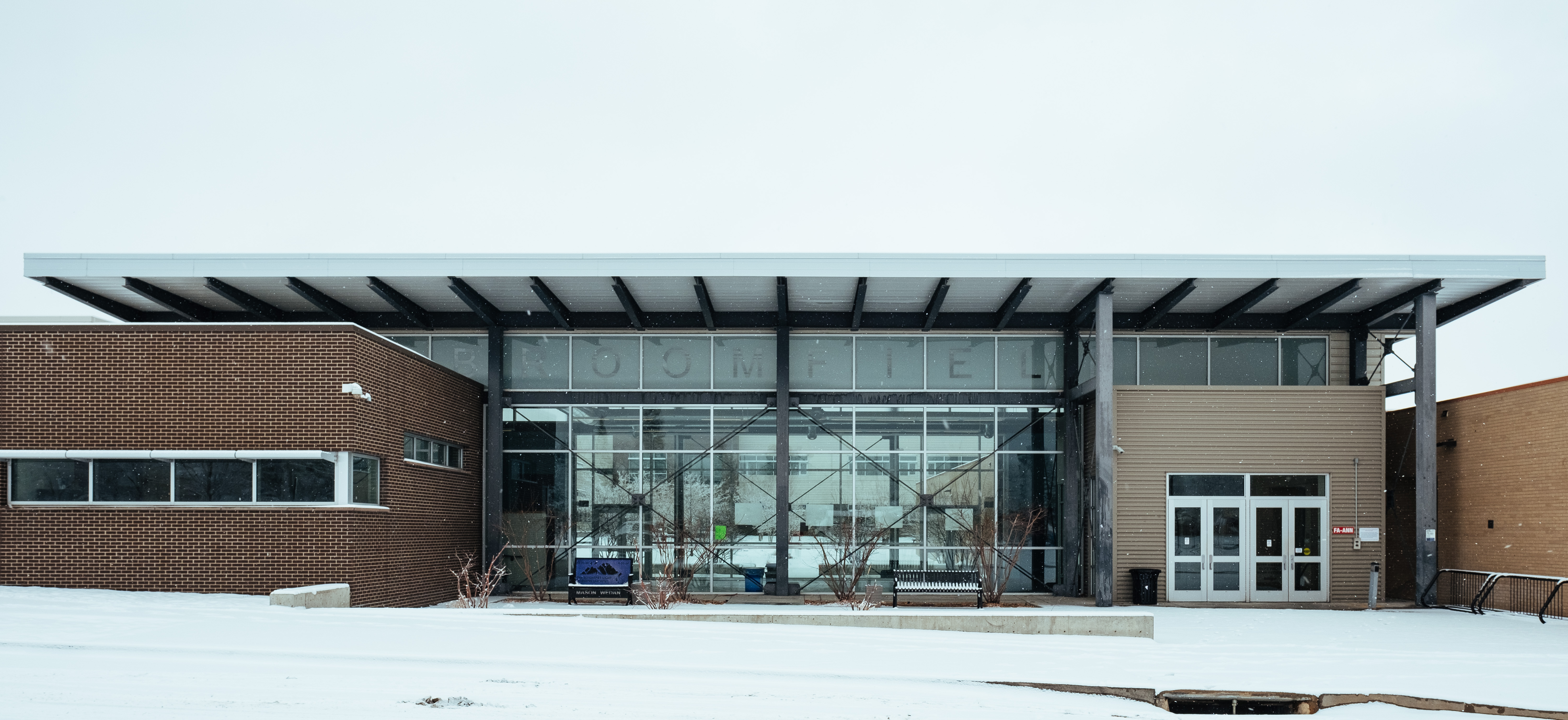

Location
- 1 Eagle Way; Broomfield, Colorado 80020; United States; 39°55′46″N 105°4′31″W

Information
- School type: Public, High school
- Motto: Be Responsible, Honor Yourself and Others, Strive for Excellence.
- Established: 1959 (67 years ago)
- School district: Boulder Valley
- CEEB code: 060148
- Principal: Ginger Ramsey
- Staff: 173
- Teaching staff: 82.79 (FTE)
- Grades: 9–12
- Student to teacher ratio: 20.44
- Campus size: 40 acres (160,000 m^{2})
- Campus type: Urban
- Colors: Royal blue and white
- Athletics: 5A
- Athletics conference: Front Range League
- Mascot: Eagle
- Rival: Legacy
- Newspaper: Eagle's Cry
- Elevation: 5,396 ft (1,640 m) AMSL
- Website: brh.bvsd.org

Broomfield High School is a public high school in Broomfield, Colorado, part of the Boulder Valley School District.

== History ==
In 1961, a junior and senior high school opened at 14th and Daphne to serve students within the newly incorporated city of Broomfield. High school classes at the school had begun in the fall of 1964. While remodeled several times in the intervening years, the original buildings are part of the present Broomfield High School. From June 2008 to August 2009, the school underwent an extensive $27 million renovation, where in most of the original junior high school portion of the school was replaced with a modern two-story structure.

== Demographics ==
The demographic breakdown of the 1,605 students enrolled in 2016–17 was:

- Asian: 4.4%
- Black: 1.2%
- American Indian/Alaskan Native: 0.4%
- Hawaiian Native/Pacific Islander: 0.1%
- Hispanic: 19.8%
- White: 69.4%
- Two or more races: 4.6%

Students eligible for free or reduced lunch: 11.0%

== Notable alumni ==
- Bruce Arnold (1990) - archer and retired professor
- Brandon Bailey — baseball pitcher, MLB
- Gustav Olofsson — hockey defenceman, NHL
- Walter Pennington — baseball pitcher, MLB
- Timothy Tymkovich (1975) — federal judge
