= Boulder Valley School District =

School district in Colorado, United States

Boulder Valley School District No.2

Address
- 6500 Arapahoe Road Boulder, Colorado, 80303; United States
- Coordinates: 40°00′52″N 105°12′04″W

District information
- Established: 1960 (66 years ago)
- Superintendent: Rob Anderson
- NCES District ID: 0802490

Students and staff
- Enrollment: 29,240 (2020-2021)
- Staff: 1,717.07 (on an FTE basis)
- Student–teacher ratio: 17.03

Other information
- Website: www.bvsd.org

The Boulder Valley School District No. Re2 is a school district in Colorado, United States. It is headquartered in the BVSD Education Center in unincorporated Boulder County, near Boulder. The district serves Boulder, Gold Hill, Jamestown, Lafayette, Louisville, Nederland, Superior, and Ward. Its area also includes portions of Broomfield and Erie.

The Boulder Valley Board of Education officially appointed Rob Anderson to be the superintendent on July 1, 2018. Anderson was previously the Deputy Superintendent of Academics in the Fulton County School System. He has been an educator since 1997, having previously worked in Florida and Georgia.

Anderson replaced Cindy Stevenson, the ex-head of Jefferson County Public Schools, who had been hired as the interim superintendent on June 19, 2017. Stevenson succeeded Bruce K. Messinger, who was fired on May 9, 2017 over an unspecified complaint.

Boulder Valley is known for being one of the highest paying districts in the state of Colorado. In 2018, teachers in the district were reportedly paid 45 percent above the state average. The average teacher salary was $75,000.

== History ==
Prior to the School District Organization Act of 1957 passed by the Colorado Legislature, Boulder County was served by multiple local school districts. The consolidation of many smaller districts resulted from the Act and by 1960, Boulder County was served by two reorganized school districts. Boulder Valley School District RE-2 serves the southern half of the county; Saint Vrain Valley School District RE-1J, the northern half. One of Boulder Valley's oldest schools, Whittier International Elementary School, is the oldest continuously-operating school in Boulder County. In 1882, the school opened under the name "the Pine Street School" but was later renamed “Whittier” after the poet John Greenleaf Whittier, who kept a correspondence with the students.

== Community programs ==
Community courses and extended day care opportunities are provided to district residents by Community Schools, an organization that uses tuition and facility-use fees for operational expenses. It operates four programs: Lifelong Learning, which offers enrichment courses for children K-12; Kindergarten Care, which offers extended child care for kindergarten students, the School Age Program, which offers before and after school programs and summer day camps for elementary school students; and the BVSD Facility Use Program, which makes school facilities available to the public. Other programs offered by BVSD include: Safe Routes to School, which aims to reduce traffic congestion around schools and promote healthy lifestyles; and the Boulder Valley Safe Schools Coalition, which aims to ensure each school is a place where everyone can belong. One of BVSD's values is to "respect the inherent value of each student and incorporate the strengths and diversity of students, families, staff and communities," and supports that value through American Indian education, language support, and a seal of bi-literacy recognition.

== Educational approach ==
The Boulder Valley School District (BVSD) is recognized for its diverse educational programs and its efforts to integrate innovative practices within its curriculum. However, some students and stakeholders have expressed concerns regarding the effectiveness of certain programs and initiatives. Reports have indicated challenges related to the implementation and impact of various success programs, which may not always meet the diverse needs of all students. Issues such as program accessibility, effectiveness in addressing individual learning needs, and resource allocation have been areas of concern.

== Schools ==
Boulder Valley has 56 schools in total. This includes eight top ranking high schools in the state of Colorado, according to the US News rankings.

=== Elementary schools ===
- Alicia Sanchez International School
- Bear Creek Elementary School
- Birch Elementary School
- Boulder Community School of Integrated Studies
- Coal Creek Elementary School
- Columbine Elementary School
- Community Montessori School
- Creekside Elementary School
- Crest View Elementary School
- Douglass Elementary School
- Eisenhower Elementary School
- Emerald Elementary School
- Escuela Bilingüe Pioneer/Pioneer Bilingual Elementary School
- Fireside Elementary School
- Flatirons Elementary School
- Foothill Elementary School
- Gold Hill Elementary School
- Heatherwood Elementary School
- High Peaks Elementary School
- Jamestown Elementary School
- Kohl Elementary School
- Lafayette Elementary School
- Louisville Elementary School
- Mesa Elementary School
- Nederland Elementary School
- Peak to Peak Charter Elementary School
- Ryan Elementary School
- Superior Elementary School
- University Hill Elementary School
- Whittier International Elementary School

=== K-8 Schools ===
- Aspen Creek K-8 School
- Eldorado PK-8 School
- Horizons K-8 Alternative Charter School
- Meadowlark K-8 School
- Monarch K-8 School

=== Middle schools ===
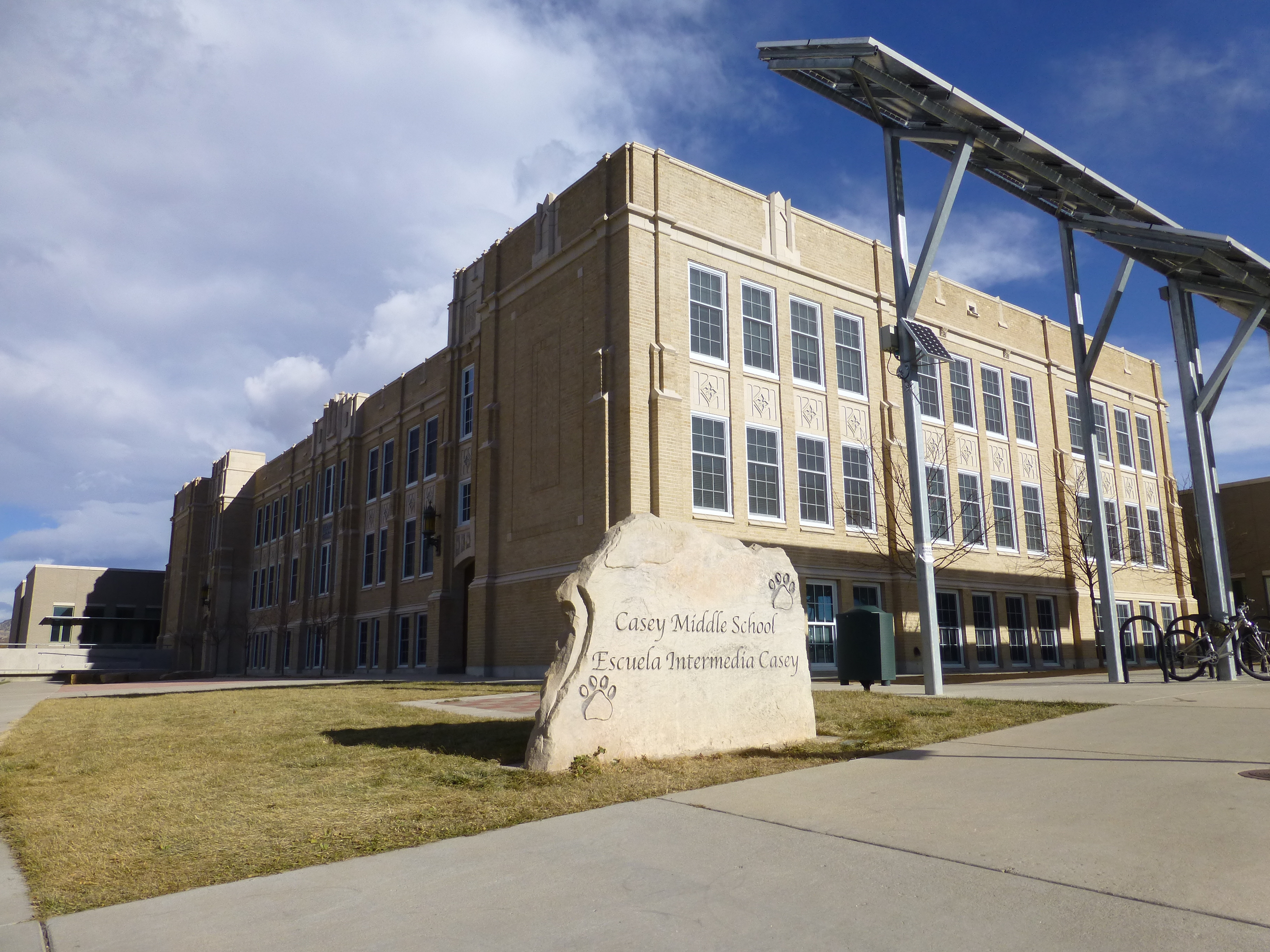
Casey Middle School

- Angevine Middle School
- Boulder Universal Online School
- Broomfield Heights Middle School
- Casey Middle School
- Centennial Middle School
- Halcyon Middle-Senior School (special education)
- Louisville Middle School
- Manhattan Middle School of Arts and Academics
- Peak to Peak Charter Middle School
- Platt CHOICE Program
- Platt Middle School
- Southern Hills Middle School
- Summit Middle Charter School

=== 6-12 Schools ===
- Nederland Middle-Senior High School

=== High schools ===
- Arapahoe Ridge High School
- Boulder High School
- Boulder Preparatory High School
- Boulder TEC
- Boulder Universal Online School
- Broomfield High School
- Centaurus High School
- Fairview High School
- Halcyon Middle/Senior School (special education)
- Justice High School
- Monarch High School
- New Vista High School
- Peak to Peak High School

== Bond project ==
In 2006, $296.8 million was approved for district facility improvements by the voters of the Boulder Valley School District. The bond planned to cover 63 projects. There were several themes formed in respect to the types of fixes needed in each school: improve the physical condition of buildings, educational functionality improvements, replacement schools, safe/healthy/comfortable schools, educational innovation, early childhood education, operational efficiency/functionality, enrollment growth in east county, and energy efficiency/sustainability. There are three phases planned, with the most needed changes in the first phase. The process to identify the needs of each facility was a two year long assessment that included gathering information and public processing. The work included reviewing existing data, onsite inspections, interviews, and committee meetings.
