= Fairview High School (Colorado) =

School in Boulder, Colorado, United States

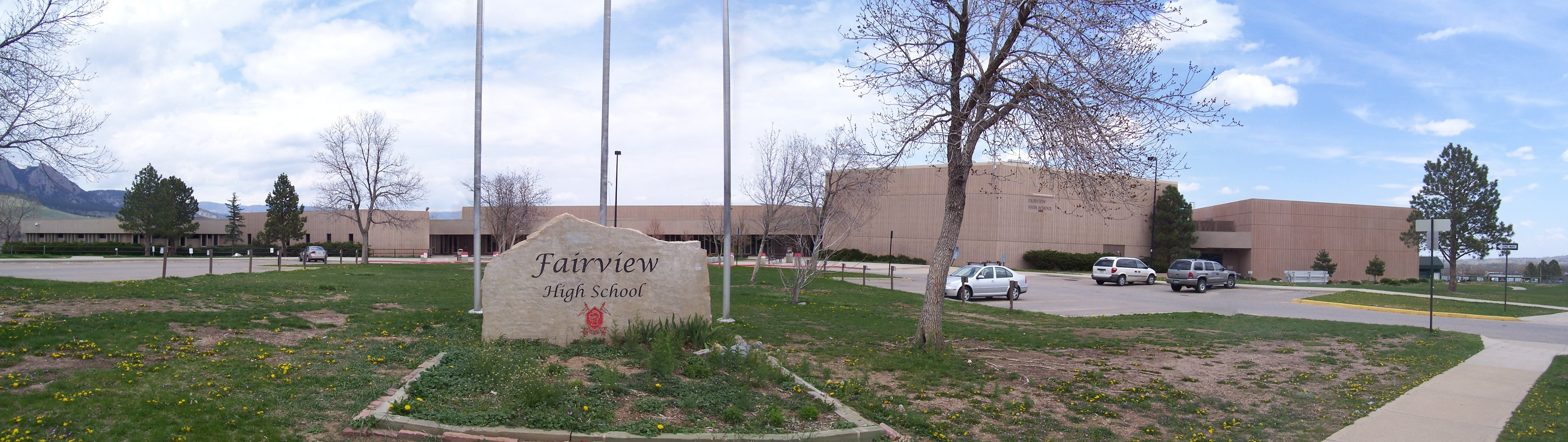

Location
- 1515 Greenbriar Boulevard; Boulder, Boulder, Colorado 80305; United States; 39°58′19″N 105°14′46″W

Information
- School type: Public High School Public
- Established: 1960 (66 years ago)
- School district: Boulder Valley School District
- CEEB code: 060118
- Director: None
- Principal: Brent Caldwell
- Staff: ~1000 (FTE)
- Grades: 9–12
- Enrollment: 1,977 (2024–25)
- Student to teacher ratio: 22.35
- Campus type: Suburban
- Colors: Red and white
- Slogan: "Sko Knights!"
- Song: Fairview Fight Song
- Athletics conference: CHSAA Class 5A
- Mascot: Knight
- Rivals: Boulder High School
- USNWR ranking: 7
- National ranking: 249
- Newspaper: Royal Banner
- Yearbook: Lance
- Feeder schools: Southern Hills Middle School, Summit Middle School
- Website: fah.bvsd.org

Location of Fairview High School in Boulder, Colorado

Fairview High School is a public, coeducational, comprehensive BVSD secondary school located in Boulder, Colorado, 26 miles (40 km) northwest of Denver. Nearly two thousand students attend the school. It is in the 5A category of the Colorado High School Activities Association (CHSAA). The school's enrollment was 1,977 in the 2024–25 school year.

== History ==
Fairview High School originally opened in 1960, in a building on Baseline Road that is now home to Nevin Platt Middle School. The current school building opened in 1971, designed by Hobart D. Wagener, a Boulder architect who designed other local public buildings such as the University of Colorado Kittredge Dormitories and Williams Village. The modernist building was initially lauded for its 'avant-garde' design, which featured hexagonal classroom clusters, ramps, and open classroom concept that was popular in the 1970s.

== Demographics ==
2012–2013 academic year
	Percent
Female	52
Male	48
Native American/Alaskan	0.2
Asian	10
Black/African-American	0.5
Hispanic/Latino	7
White/Caucasian	77
Two or more ethnicities	5
Free/reduced lunch	7
Reading proficient/advanced	88
Mathematics proficient/advanced	74

== Academics ==
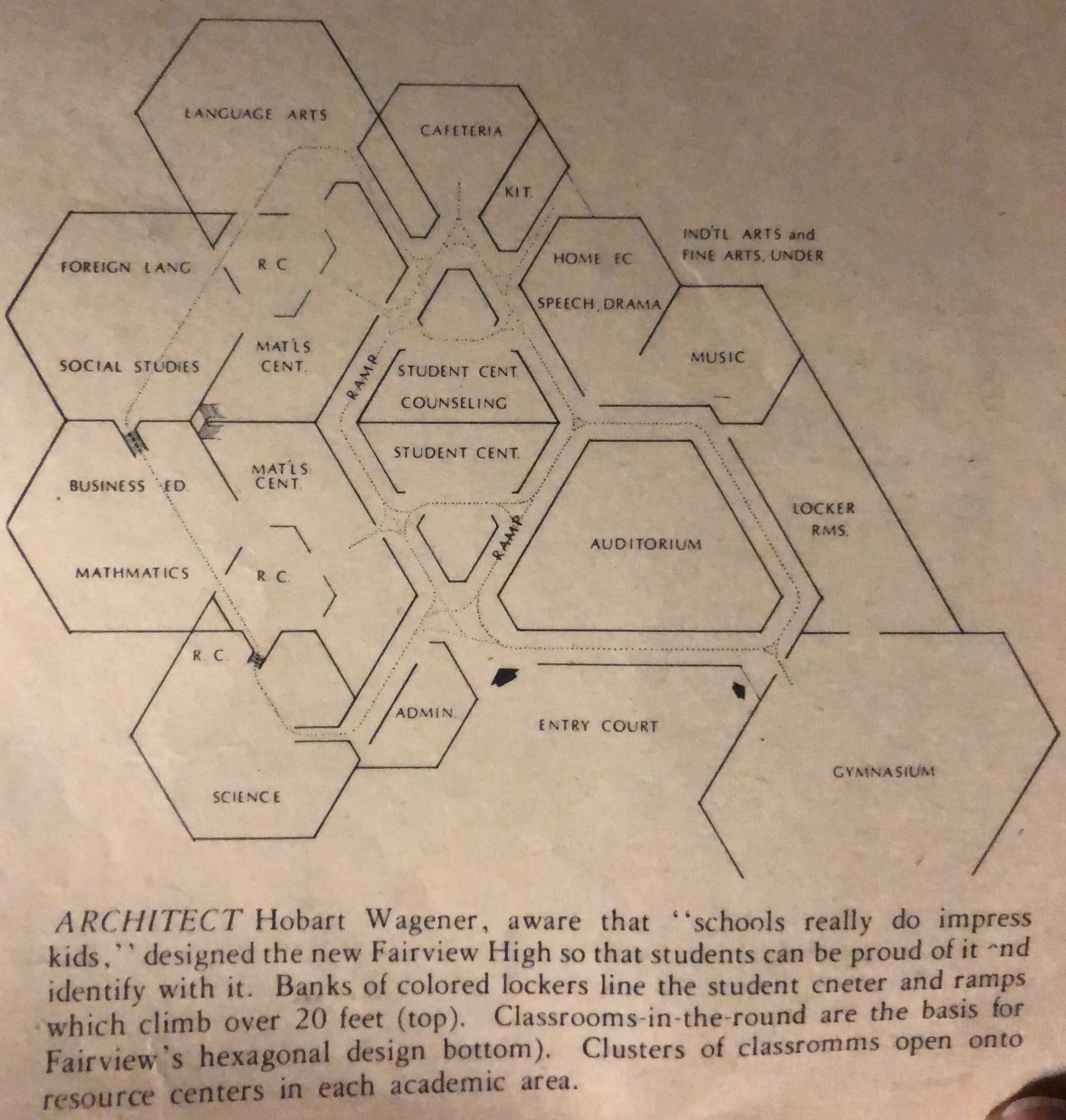
Original map of Fairview High School printed in the Boulder Daily Camera on September 26, 1971.

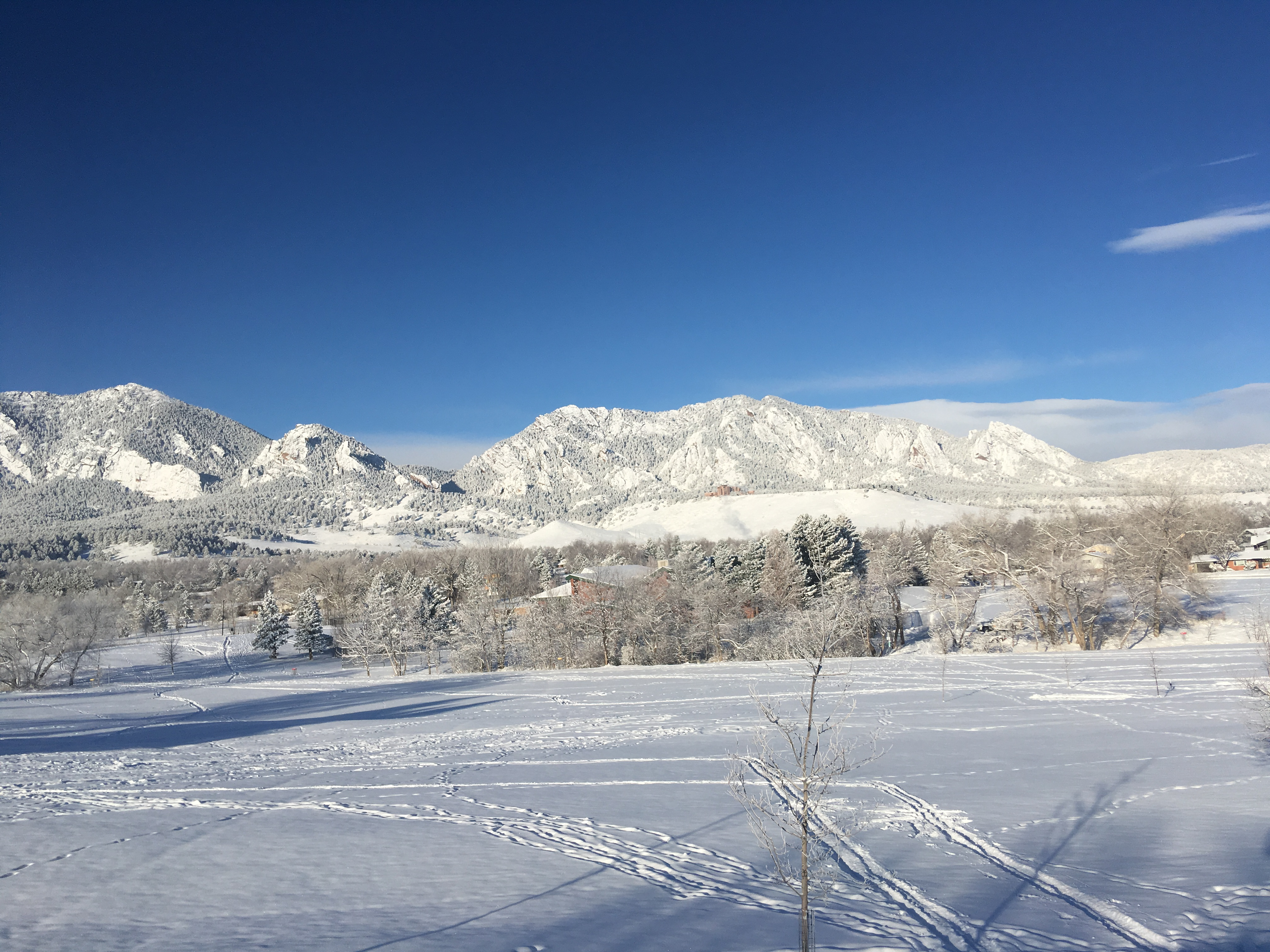
View of the Boulder Flatirons from Fairview High School. February 7, 2019.

In 2020, Fairview was ranked 249th by U.S. News & World Report in their National High School Rankings; 7th best high school in Colorado, also by US News; 2nd best public high school in Colorado by Niche; and best college prep public high school in Colorado, also by Niche. The school offers kids help with college preparation through its college and Career Center. Fairview has a reputation for being academically demanding.

== Athletics ==
=== Sports offered ===
==== Fall ====
- Cross country
- Golf, boys'
- Football
- Soccer, boys'
- Tennis, boys'
- Softball
- Volleyball
- Cheer/Poms
- Mountain biking

==== Winter ====
- Basketball
- Cheer/Poms
- Swimming and diving, girls'
- Hockey, boys'
- Wrestling

==== Spring ====
- Baseball
- Swimming and diving, boys'
- Lacrosse
- Golf, girls'
- Soccer, girls'
- Tennis, girls'
- Track and field

=== State championships ===
State Championships
Sport	No. of Championships	Year
Baseball	1	1993
Basketball, boys'	1	1981
Basketball, girls'	1	1985
Chess	6	1991, 1992, 1993, 1994, 1995, 2017
Cross country, boys'	2	2000, 2001
Cross country, girls'	6	1980, 1982, 1984, 1999, 2001, 2005
Football	3	1978, 1979, 1987
Soccer, girls'	1	2010
Soccer, boys'	1	2021
Swimming, girls'	4	2004, 2016, 2018, 2019
Tennis, girls'	1	2016
Tennis, boys'	1	2017
Track & field, boys'	2	1985, 1990
Track & field, girls'	1	1990
Gymnastics, boys' (former)	2	1965, 1966
Mountain Biking	1	2017
Marching Band	1	1986
Total	33	

=== Sexual assault controversy ===
On November 22, 2019, the Fairview High School football team's star quarterback and three star Northwestern recruit, Aidan Atkinson, was arrested on three counts of sexual assault, five counts of unlawful sexual misconduct, and one count of attempted sexual assault after he turned himself in to police. The case was reported on by the USA Today, the Denver Post, and the Boulder Daily Camera, among other publications. In 2021, he was found not guilty on most charges and later plead guilty to two lesser charges of misdemeanor harassment. As a result of the school's handling of the incident, the principal was placed on leave and later retired as a Title IX investigation was initiated.

== Notable alumni ==
=== Academics ===
- Lada Adamic, network scientist
- Natalia Toro (born c. 1985, class of 1999) - physicist at the Perimeter Institute

=== Actors and musicians ===
- Jessica Biel (born 1982, class of 2000) - actress in films and television, played Mary Camden in TV series 7th Heaven, married to singer-actor Justin Timberlake; Biel never fully attended Fairview, she was only tutored there, though she did attend feeder school Southern Hills Middle.
- Ace Young (born 1980, class of 1999) - American Idol finalist
- Jill Goodacre (born 1964, class of 1982) - former model and actress, married to musician Harry Connick Jr.
- Sheryl Lee (born 1967, class of 1985) - actress, played Laura Palmer on TV show Twin Peaks
- Rudresh Mahanthappa (born 1971, class of 1988) - jazz alto saxophonist and composer, Guggenheim fellow
- Dizzy Reed - keyboardist, Guns N' Roses
- Jacob Sproul (born 1983, Class of 2001) - rhythm guitarist and vocalist of rock band Rose Hill Drive
- Joan Van Ark (born 1943, class of 1961) - actress, played Valene Ewing in primetime soap opera Knots Landing
- Sheree J. Wilson (born 1958, class of 1977) - played April on TV series Dallas, and Alex on Walker, Texas Ranger
- Sean Foreman (Born 1985, class of 2003) - Vocalist for the electronic pop duo 3OH!3.
- Josh Andres Rivera (Born 1995, class of 2012) - Actor, known for West Side Story, The Hunger Games: The Ballad of Songbirds & Snakes, and American Sports Story.

=== Athletes ===
- Joe Barry (born 1970), run game coordinator and linebackers coach for Miami Dolphins
- Kenny Bell (born 1992, class of 2010) - NFL wide receiver
- Tony Boselli (born 1972, class of 1991) - Hall of Fame NFL offensive tackle selected 2nd overall in 1995 NFL draft and first overall in 2002 NFL expansion draft; five-time Pro Bowler (1996–2000); three-time All-Pro (1997–99)
- Tom Chambers (born 1959, class of 1977) - basketball player, selected 8th overall in 1981 NBA draft, four-time All-Star, played for 1992-93 Phoenix Suns team that lost to Chicago Bulls in NBA Finals
- Jesse Crain (born 1981, class of 1999) - MLB pitcher
- Daryl Dickey (born 1961), football administrator, coach and player
- Chris Foote (born 1956), NFL center
- Heather Gilchrist (born 2004), soccer player
- Margo Hayes (born 1998, class of 2016) - professional climber and first woman to climb a route graded 9a+
- Jay Howell (born 1955), three-time All-Star MLB pitcher
- Carlo Kemp (born 1998), American football player
- Scott Lockwood (born 1968) - NFL running back
- Dustin Lyman - NFL football player
- John Mozeliak (born 1969, class of 1987) - general manager of MLB's St. Louis Cardinals (2007-2025), 2011 World Series champion
- Shane O'Neill (born 1993, class of 2012) - MLS soccer player
- Chuck Pagano (born 1960, class of 1979) - NFL head coach, Indianapolis Colts, 2012–2017
- John Pagano (born 1967, class of 1985) - assistant coach of NFL's Oakland Raiders; defensive coordinator for San Diego Chargers 2012-16
- Emma Weber (born 2004) - Olympic gold medalist swimmer, did not graduate from Fairview
- Cat Zingano (born 1982) - professional mixed martial arts fighter, UFC's bantamweight division
- Brooke Raboutou (Born 2001) is an American professional rock climber and 2024 Olympian

=== Other ===
- Hillary Hall (born 1965) - Boulder Colorado county clerk
- Ishani Shrestha (born 1991, class of 2009) - 2013 Miss World Top 10 contestant and winner of 2013 Beauty With a Purpose, Miss Nepal 2013
- Jessica Watkins (born 1988, class of 2006) - NASA astronaut, geologist, rugby player, and aquanaut.

== Notable staff ==
=== Current staff ===
- Shayne Culpepper, two-time Olympian in track and field and guidance counselor

=== Former staff ===
- Carol Callan, current USA Basketball Women's National Team Director and former assistant principal (1993-1995) and director of athletics (1986-1995) of Fairview
- Alan Culpepper, two-time Olympian in track and field and former (2019-2021) Fairview cross-country coach
