= National Education Policy Center =

American research center

The National Education Policy Center (NEPC) is a non-profit education policy research center located in the School of Education at the University of Colorado at Boulder. It was founded in 2010 and is funded by a variety of governmental organizations, NGOs, and foundations. The Center’s publications are intended for a broad audience that includes academic experts, policy makers, the media, and the general public. The Center's goal is to provide high quality information in support of democratic deliberation about education policy. The Center sponsors research, produces policy briefs, and publishes expert third party reviews of think tank reports. NEPC will house a new Initiative on Diversity, Equity, and Learning (IDEAL), which is funded by the Ford Foundation. NEPC is also the home of the Education Policy Alliance, a nationwide network of university-based research centers and organizations engaged in education policy research.

== Mission ==
The mission of the National Education Policy Center is to produce and disseminate high-quality, peer-reviewed research to inform education policy discussions.

== Projects ==
- Think Tank Review
- Commercialism in Education Research Unit
- Open access journal Education Review.
- Schools of Opportunity
- Research Hub for Youth Organizing
- Fund Education Instead
- Price of Opportunity

== Funding ==
NEPC is funded by both national teachers unions, the National Education Association and American Federation of Teachers, as well as the Ford Foundation, the Great Lakes Center for Education Research and Practice, the Atlantic Philanthropies, The Nellie Mae Education Foundation, The Stuart Foundation, the National Public Education Support Fund, and other contributors.

== See also ==
- National Center on Education and the Economy
- Center for Excellence in Education
