= Lafayette House =

Historic miner's boarding house in Lafayette, Colorado, United States

- U.S. National Register of Historic Places
- Colorado State Register of Historic Properties
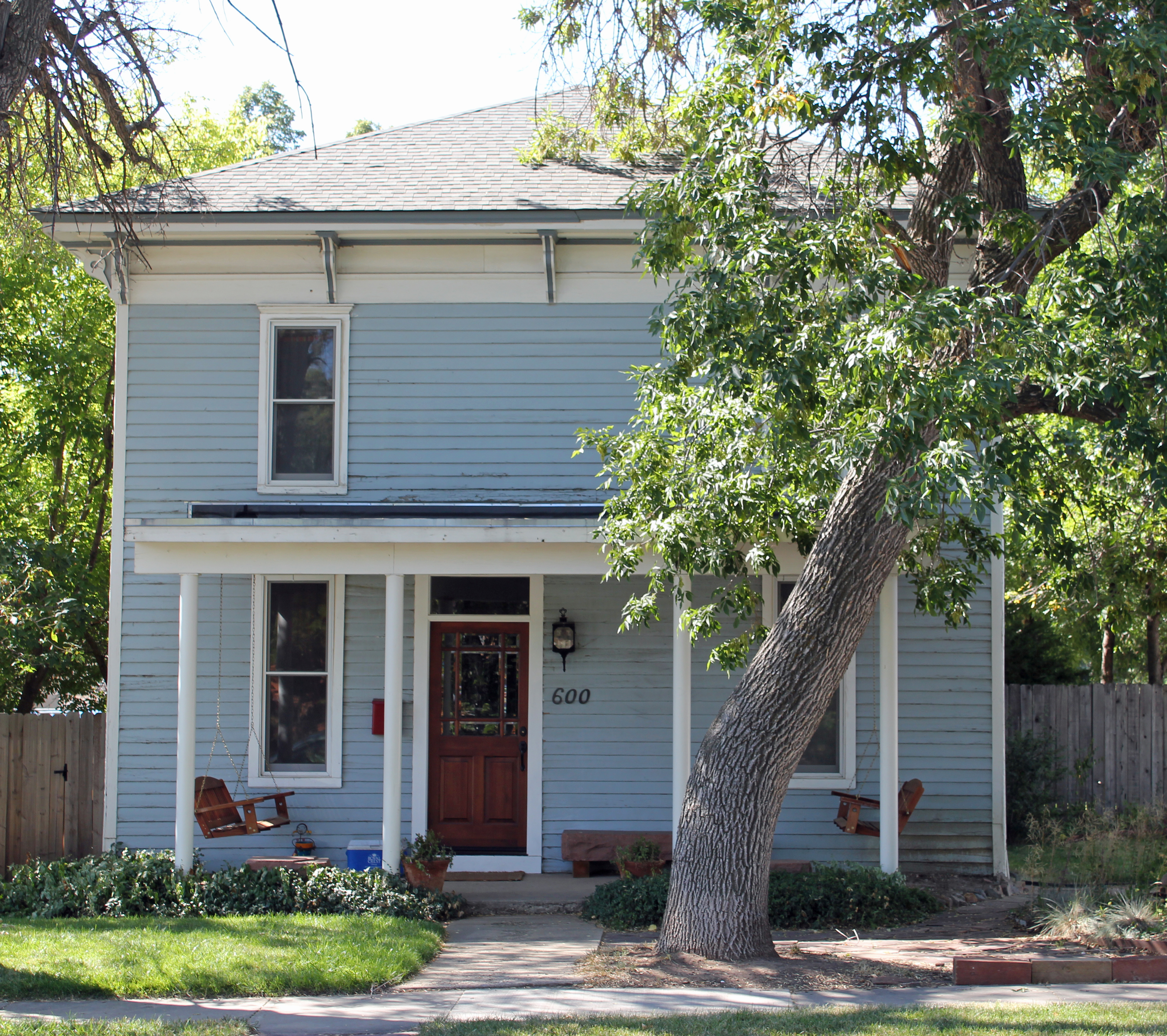

- Location within Colorado Location within the United States
- Location: 600 East Simpson Street, Lafayette, Colorado
- Coordinates: 39°59′52.7″N 105°5′2.46″W
- Built: 1900
- Architectural style: Vernacular, wood, miner's boarding house
- NRHP reference No.: 83001300
- CSRHP No.: 5BL.823
- Added to NRHP: May 20, 1983

The Lafayette House is a historic boarding house located at 600 East Simpson Street in Lafayette, Colorado. Built in 1900, the house opened as a boarding house for coal miners working in nearby mines. The structure now serves as a private residence. It is located at the southeast corner of East Simpson Street and South Finch Avenue.

== History ==
The house originally opened as a boarding house for overnight guests in 1900. In 1901 the house was owned by John V. Higgs who promoted it with the motto "The Best is None Too Good." It later served as host for Baldwin-Felts detectives who were brought to Lafayette by coal mine owners to assist in stopping the Colorado Coalfield War. During the 1940s, the house became the Pillar of Fire Church. The wash house was converted to a nursery school, which was the only one in town at the time.

The house was listed on the National Register of Historic Places on May 20, 1983.

== Architecture ==
The house is a large two-story rectangular house with a hip roof and small porches on the north and south sides. The exterior was constructed using narrow clapboard siding. The first story windows are bigger than the second floor and have the same simple surrounds with cornice heads. There is a hitching post of Lyons sandstone on the west side of the house. In the 1940s the interior wash house was converted to a nursery school. In 1979 a porch was built on the north side and the house was repainted. This house presently sites on its original site of construction.

== Significance ==
The house is Lafayette's best preserved boarding house. It contributes to the understanding of coal mining lifestyle and the history of the mining town.

== See also ==
- National Register of Historic Places listings in Boulder County, Colorado
- Miller House
- Lewis House
- Kullgren House
