= Kullgren House =

Historic miner's boarding house in Lafayette, Colorado, United States

- U.S. National Register of Historic Places
- Colorado State Register of Historic Properties
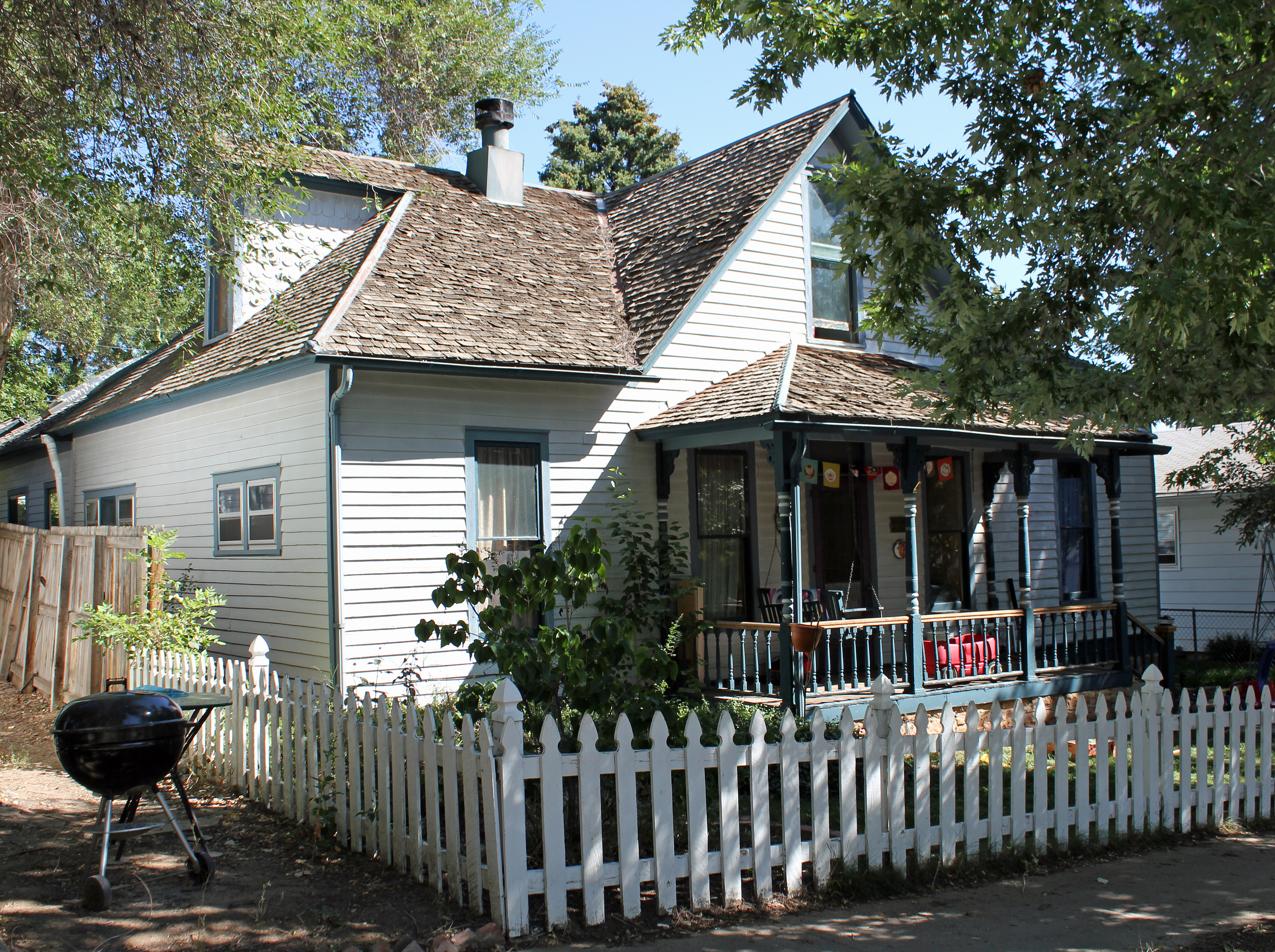

- Location within Colorado Location within the United States
- Location: 209 East Cleveland Street, Lafayette, Colorado
- Coordinates: 39°59′51″N 105°5′17″W
- Built: c. 1890
- Architectural style: Vernacular miner's cottage
- NRHP reference No.: 83001299
- CSRHP No.: 5BL.813
- Added to NRHP: May 20, 1983

The Kullgren House is a historic residence located at 209 East Cleveland Street in Lafayette, Colorado. Built in 1896, the house served as a private residence and boarding house for coal miners and later school teachers. It remains as one of the best preserved examples of the residential architecture typical of the thriving element of Lafayette. It is associated with Andrew Kullgren, who lived in the home from 1896 to 1919.

== History ==
The house was originally constructed in 1896 by Andrew Kullgren. The house was constructed as a residence with enough rooms to allow coal miners as boarders, which was a common method for owners to bring in additional income.

Andrew Kullgren arrived in Lafayette during the early boom years and by 1892 was operating a shoe store in the town. He was elected to City Council in 1894 and served for three years. In 1896, Kullgren switched his line of business to manufacturing harnesses and had the home constructed. He also constructed a small wash house at the back of the home, which provided an area for returning miners to clean up after working in the mines.

In 1919, Kullgren sold the house to Ben Cundall from Sutton, Nebraska, whom worked in a local retail store and served as mayor of Lafayette on three occasions. The property was part of the Cundall estate until it was sold in 1971.

The house was approved by the Colorado state review committee for nomination to the National Register of Historic Places in early 1983, and was officially listed on the register on May 20, 1983.

== Architecture ==
The Kullgren House is a vernacular dwelling with a square floor-plan and a steeply pitched hip roof. The open porch has original turned posts with gingerbread brackets.

In 1908, the house was raised and remodeled with a stone foundation added under the building.

In 1974, decorative brackets were removed from the front porch and wood railing was replaced with wrought iron.

== Significance ==
The Kullgren House is historically significant as a well-preserved example of Lafayette's coal-era miner's housing. The house demonstrates the more prosperous element of Lafayette.

== See also ==
- National Register of Historic Places listings in Boulder County, Colorado
- Miller House
- Lewis House
- Lafayette House
