= Lewis House (Lafayette, Colorado) =

Historic miner's house in Lafayette, Colorado, United States

- U.S. National Register of Historic Places
- Colorado State Register of Historic Properties
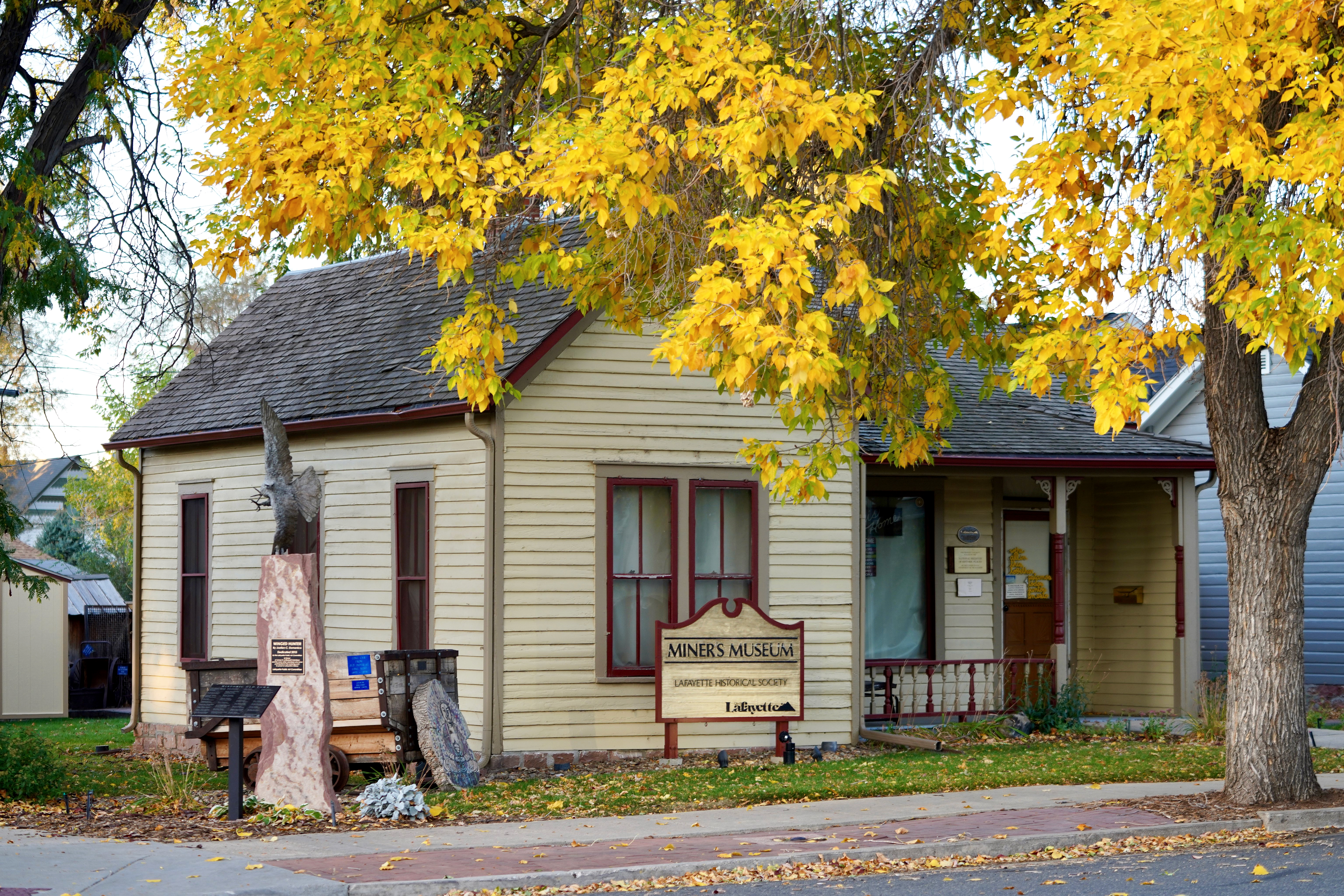

- Location within Colorado Location within the United States
- Location: 108 East Simpson Street, Lafayette, Colorado
- Coordinates: 39°59′53.3″N 105°5′22.4″W
- Built: c. 1890
- Architectural style: Vernacular miner's cottage
- NRHP reference No.: 83001301
- CSRHP No.: 5BL.819
- Added to NRHP: May 20, 1983

The Lewis House is a historic miner’s residence located at 108 East Simpson Street in Lafayette, Colorado. Built in the 1890s at the Gladstone Mine near Lafayette, the house was later moved into town between 1910 and 1913. It is an intact example of coal-era miners’ housing and is associated with the Lewis family, who lived there from 1913 until 1975. The structure now serves as the Lafayette History Museum.

== History ==
The house was originally constructed in the 1890s by Oscar Padfield, owner of the Gladstone Mine, to provide housing for miners. When the mine closed, Padfield gave the house to his son, who relocated it to East Simpson Street between 1910 and 1913. The Lewis family purchased the house shortly afterward.

William E. Lewis, a coal miner employed at the nearby Gatfield Mine, was active in union efforts during the Colorado Coalfield War of the 1910s. Oral histories describe him as “a kind of leader,” with union meetings frequently held in the Lewis home during the strike years from 1910 to 1914. Due to ongoing violence, the family often slept in the basement for safety. William Lewis died in 1914 from a mining-related illness, leaving his wife Hannah to raise their children. She supported the family by taking in laundry, while the children also worked. Hannah lived in the home until her death in 1975.

In 1976 the house was sold to the City of Lafayette. With support from the Lafayette Historical Society, the building was converted into a museum dedicated to the town’s mining heritage.

The house was listed on the National Register of Historic Places on May 20, 1983.

In 2026, the building received a $50,000 History Colorado grant to support the preparation of construction plans for preservation work, such as evaluation of the foundation, windows, and siding.

== Architecture ==
The Lewis House is a one-story, L-shaped vernacular dwelling with gabled roofs. Its foundation is built of Lyons sandstone, with clapboard siding and wood shake shingles. A bay window with multiple double-hung sash windows projects from the west façade, and the original front porch, featuring turned spindles in the balustrade, remains intact. A small rear addition was constructed during the Lewis family’s tenure, but the house otherwise retains much of its original form and detail.

A Historic Structure Assessment conducted in 2019 identified several issues requiring attention, such as cracks in interior walls and evidence of settling near the southeast corner of the building.

== Significance ==
The Lewis House is historically significant as a well-preserved example of Lafayette’s coal-era miners’ housing. Its association with the labor struggles of the 1910s, as well as its long occupation by the Lewis family, highlight the role of mining families in the development of the community. The structure was later preserved as a museum to interpret this history.

== See also ==
- National Register of Historic Places listings in Boulder County, Colorado
- Miller House
- Kullgren House
- Lafayette House
