= Edward Doyle =

Edward Doyle may refer to:

- Edward Doyle (Irish politician), Irish Labour Party politician
- Edward Doyle (labor activist) (1886–1954), coal miner and union activist
- Edward C. Doyle (1882–1972), Canadian politician in the Nova Scotia House of Assembly
- Eddie Doyle (American football) (1898–1942), American football player
- Eddie Doyle (hurler) (1897–1948), Irish hurler
- Ed Doyle (politician) (1935–2026), Canadian politician
- Ed Doyle (American football) (1905–1942), American football offensive lineman
- Edward P. Doyle (Staten Island), member of the 109th New York State Legislature from Staten Island
- Edward P. Doyle (Brooklyn) (1890–1972), New York assemblyman 1926 to 1937, see 149th New York State Legislature
