= Miller House (Lafayette, Colorado) =

- U.S. National Register of Historic Places
- Colorado State Register of Historic Properties
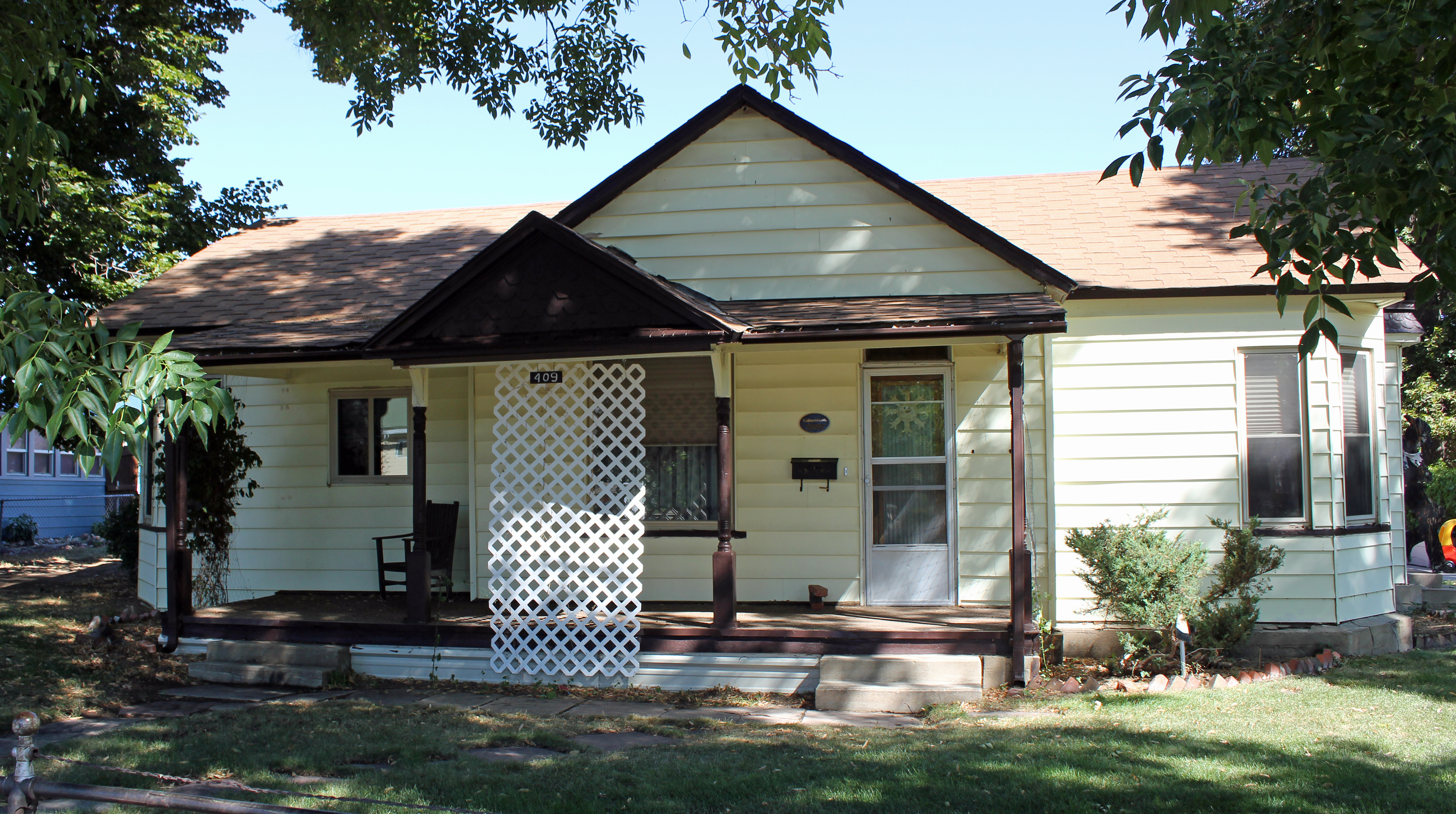

- Location within Colorado Location within the United States
- Location: 409 East Cleveland Street, Lafayette, Colorado
- Coordinates: 39°59′50.91″N 105°5′8.8″W
- Built: Late 1880s
- NRHP reference No.: 83001291
- CSRHP No.: 5BL.818
- Added to NRHP: May 20, 1983

The Miller House was built by Lafayette, Colorado's town founder Mary Miller. Miller arrived in Colorado in 1863 and after discovering coal on her land, she opened a mine and in 1888 established the coal town of Lafayette. She made charitable donations to coal mining families and the town. The Miller House was built in the late 1880s in the center of the original 150-acre townsite. She operated a school in her house on East Cleveland Street until she established the town's first school.

The house maintains its original appears, aside from the application of siding. The house is historically significant to the town for Miller's role as "the founder of the community, who was also responsible as well for the development of the coal industry in Lafayette." The house was listed on the National Register of Historic Places on May 20, 1983.

== See also ==
- National Register of Historic Places listings in Boulder County, Colorado
- Lewis House
- Lafayette House
- Kullgren House
