= Congregational Church (Lafayette, Colorado) =

Historic church in Colorado, United States

- U.S. National Register of Historic Places
- Colorado State Register of Historic Properties
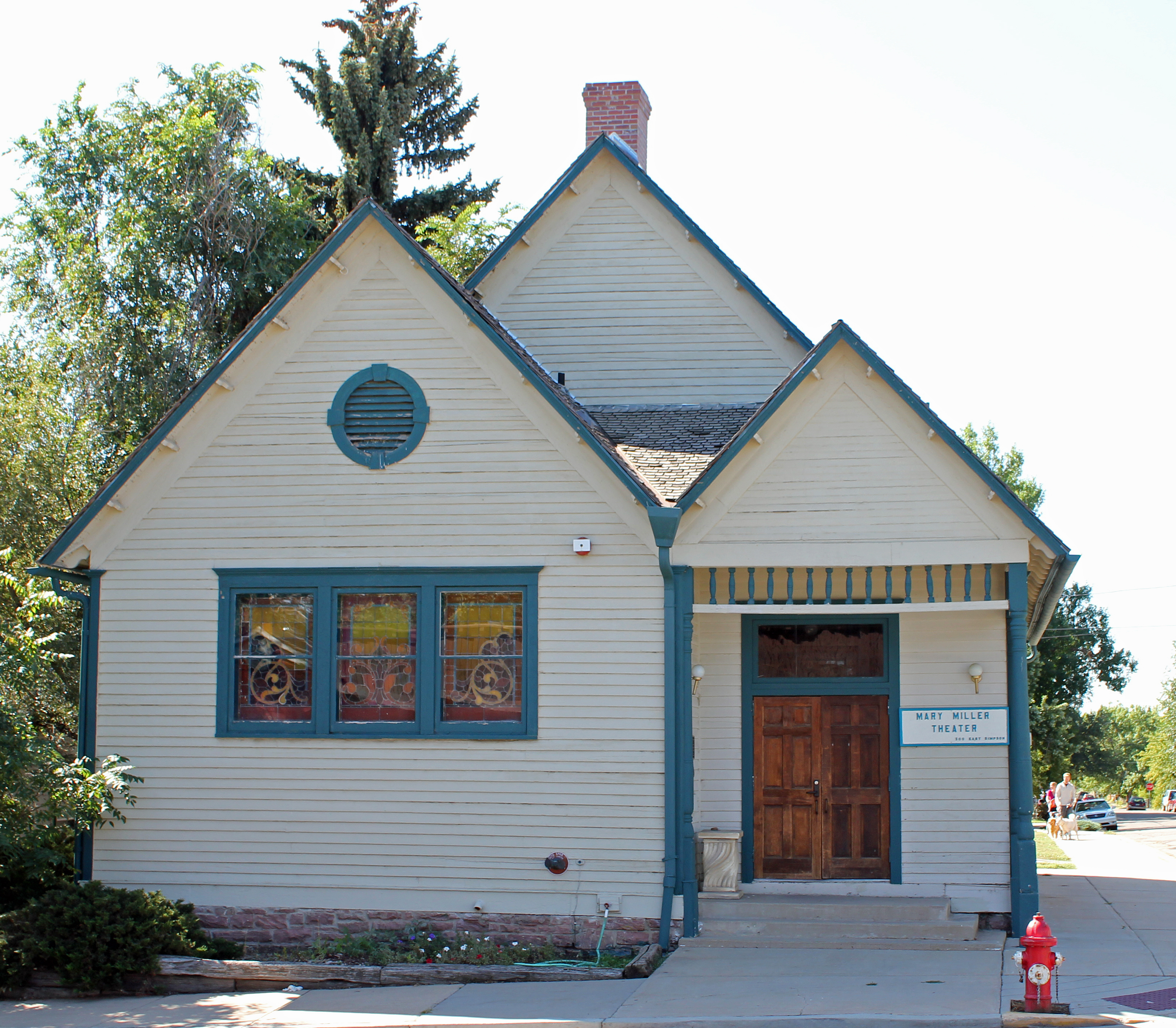

- Location within Colorado Location within the United States
- Location: 300 E. Simpson St., Lafayette, Colorado
- Coordinates: 39°59′53″N 105°5′15″W
- Area: less than one acre
- Built: 1890
- MPS: Lafayette Coal Mining Era Buildings TR
- NRHP reference No.: 83001298
- CSRHP No.: 5BL.821
- Added to NRHP: May 20, 1983

The Congregational Church at 300 E. Simpson St. in Lafayette, Colorado was listed on the U.S. National Register of Historic Places in 1983 as part of a multiple property submission, the Lafayette Coal Mining Era Buildings TR. It has served as a church, meeting hall, hospital, and library. It has been restored and remodeled for use as the Mary Miller Theater, home of the Theater Company of Lafayette.

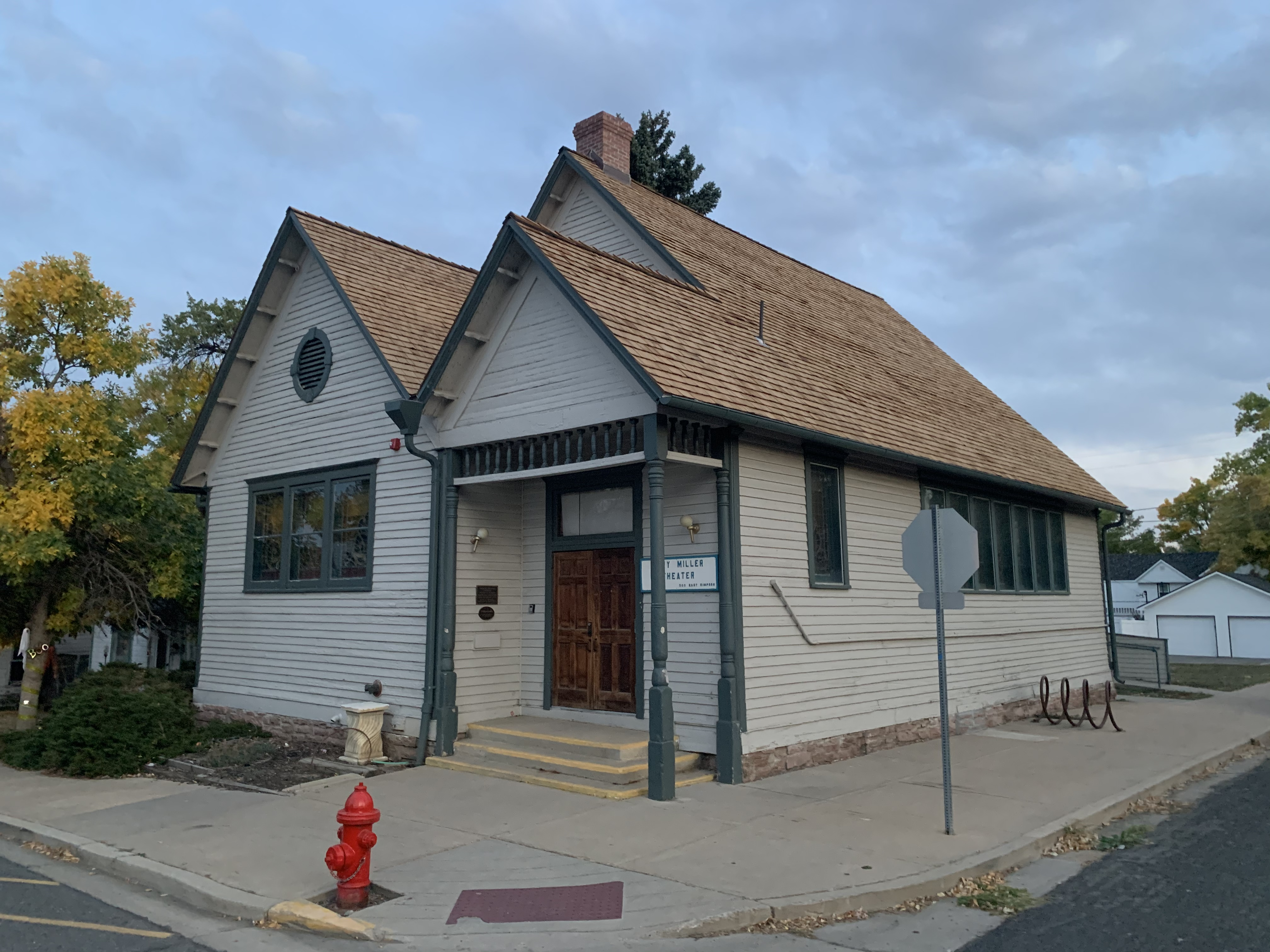
Mary Miller Theater

== History ==
The church was founded in 1890. The town's founder, Mary Miller, provided most of the funds to establish the church, arranged for its construction, and paid the minister's salary for several years. It was a community meeting place for the mining community. The church served as a medical shelter building during the 1918 influenza plague. In 1923, a small library was established in the building. The church was sold to the Christian Science Society in 1928.
