= Mary E. Miller =

Mary E. Miller may refer to:

- Mary Miller (actress), 1929-2020
- Mary Miller (Colorado businesswoman), 1843–1921
- Mary Miller (art historian)
- Mary Miller (politician), U.S. Representative from Illinois
