= Maria Handley =

American political activist (born 1977)

Maria Handley (born 4 October 1977) is a member-at-large of the Democratic National Committee from Colorado. A veteran of both Bill Bradley and Howard Dean's campaigns for the Democratic presidential nomination, Handley was appointed by Dean to the DNC. As a superdelegate to the 2008 Democratic National Convention, Handley has publicly supported Hillary Clinton.

== Biography ==
Born in rural Peru and adopted as a child by Boulder County couple Bruce and Vija Handley, Maria Handley graduated from the University of Colorado at Boulder in 1999 with a bachelor's degree in political science and a minor in history. Her parents were politically active and her father ran for state representative when she was two years old, and Handley entered professional politics shortly after graduation. She worked as a field director in Iowa and Colorado for the 2000 presidential campaign of Bill Bradley, and for Mayor Paul Schell in Seattle, Washington in 2001. She was then statewide political director for Rollie Heath's unsuccessful bid for Colorado governor in 2002.

Handley was one of the first staff members hired by the presidential campaign of Howard Dean in February 2003, serving first as Regional Political Director and then as National Deputy Director of Constituency Outreach for the Dean campaign. Following the end of Dean's presidential bid, Handley returned to Colorado and worked as field director for Ken Salazar's Senate campaign, and as Outreach Director for ProgressNow.org. She is currently working as a field consultant for Jared Polis' campaign for the Democratic nomination in Colorado's 2nd congressional district, and as campaign manager for Rollie Heath, now a candidate for the Colorado State Senate. Handley is married; she and her husband, Rich Pelletier, currently live in Lafayette, Colorado.

Handley was appointed by chairman Howard Dean to an at-large seat on the Democratic National Committee, and is a member of the DNC's Hispanic Caucus.

As a member of the Democratic National Committee, she is a superdelegate to the 2008 Democratic National Convention. In 2007, she announced her intention to vote for New York Sen. Hillary Clinton.
