= Lafayette vampire =

Boulder County, Colorado, USA urban legend

Lafayette Vampire
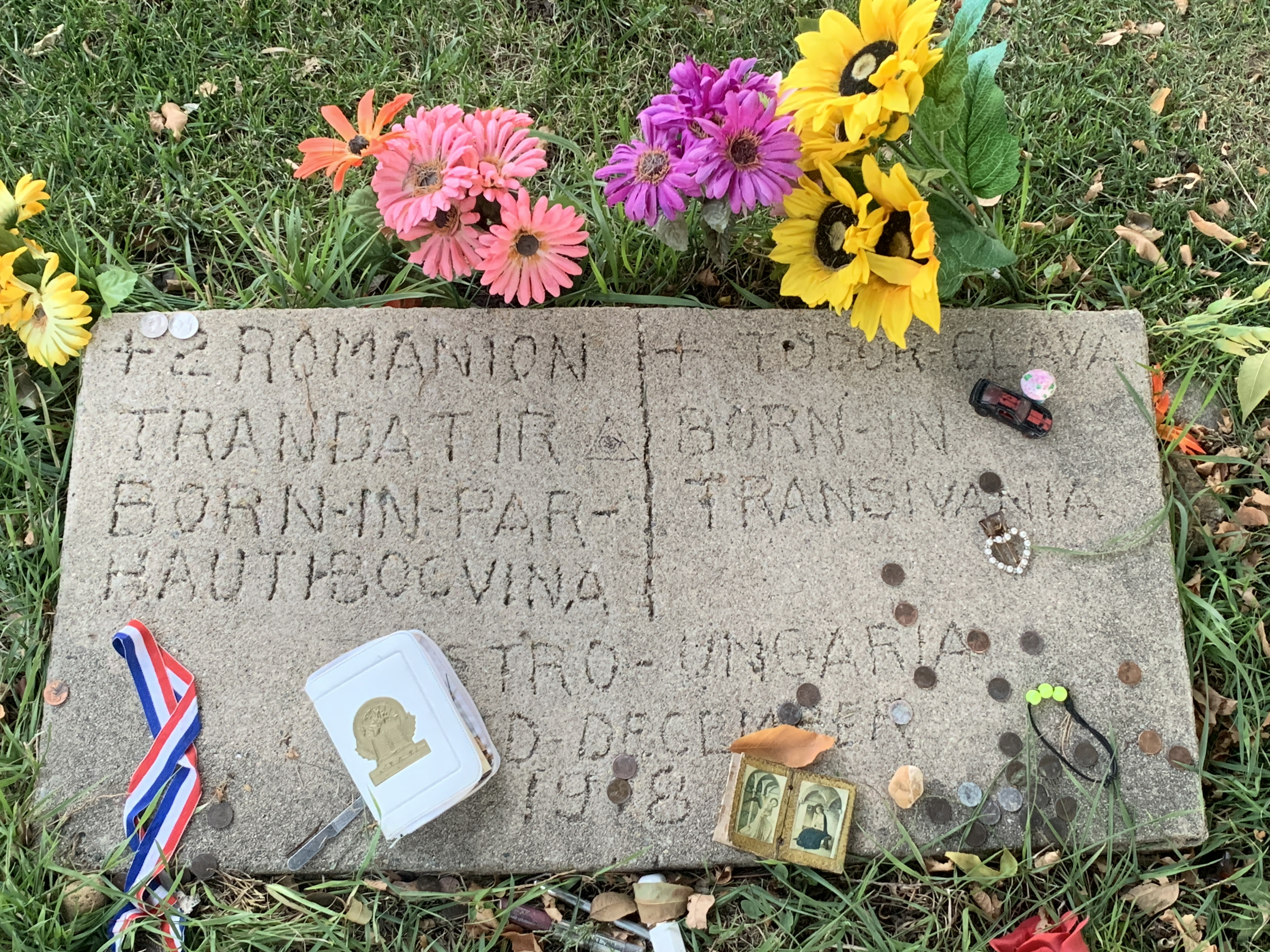
- Grave marker associated with the local legend of the “Lafayette Vampire” in Lafayette, Colorado

Creature information
- Other name: Teodor Glava

Origin
- Known for: Grave-associated urban legend linked to Teodor Glava in Lafayette
- Country: United States
- Region: Boulder County, Colorado

The Lafayette vampire is an urban legend originating in Lafayette, Colorado.

== History ==
The legend began in the 1950s, when local youth were told by their parents that a vampire was buried in the Lafayette Cemetery and if they did not get home by dark the vampire would get them. This method of enforcing good behavior is similar to the La Llorona legend in Hispanic culture.

Lafayette moms and dads were referencing Romanian immigrant and coal miner Teodor Glava, who died in 1918. His grave marker in the Potter's field section of the cemetery lists his birthplace as "Transylvania". Curator of Lafayette Miner's Museum Claudia Lund explains, "That part of the world has always had a certain history behind it. Particularly the Dracula story and everything."

The legend of the Lafayette vampire evolved in subsequent decades to mimic details of Bram Stoker's Dracula, and Bela Lugosi's classic motion picture portrayal. As Internet use grew in the 1990s, the story increased in popularity such that visitors from across the U.S. visit the grave.

As of 2024, the legend is as follows: Local residents were suspicious of coal miner Teodor Glava and, after he died in 1918, dug him up and drove a stake through his heart. That wooden stake grew into a tall juniper tree that now dominates his grave site. It is also said that Glava's fingernails grew into a "blood red" red rose bush that covered the grave until the early 2000s (although the rose bush was actually yellow). Various blog posts and newspaper articles starting in the late 1980s enhanced the legend, and state that "local youth" sighted a tall, dark figure with red eyes lurking near the grave.

Estate records at the State of Colorado Archives in Denver show that Teodor Glava was embalmed and buried about two days after he died, probably the result of Spanish flu. He had been sick for several weeks prior to his death. Estate records state that he had no relatives in Colorado.

Glava is buried in his own grave plot, adjacent to fellow Romanian John Trandafir, who was also a coal miner and died two days after Glava and is buried in his own grave plot to the left of Glava (as you face the grave marker). Trandafir and Glava share a grave marker, which is oriented at the dividing line of the separate grave plots. The two were not related.

The most entertaining variation of the legend comes from a 1993 Rocky Mountain News newspaper article. It states that 19-year-old Douglas Rowan, "a knowledgable amateur folklorist and vampirologist" who worked at Lafayette's Sonic Drive-In, had gathered knowledge about Glava from "old ladies who live over in the old part of town." The "vampirologist" continued: "The story goes that he moved here from Transylvania with his wife, but was bitten by a wolf or something, and it turned him into a vampire. He killed his wife, and a neighbor buried her and cornered him in a barn and drove a stake through his heart. A tree always grows from a vampire stake. It's what keeps him in the ground. They say that when there's full moon his soul will rise and wander around."

In 2021, Boulder County magazine Yellow Scene reported the gravesite is "filled with strange trinkets" including fresh flowers, bubble gum, and a plastic chicken.

The Lafayette Vampire gravesite can be found in the north-central edge of the Lafayette Cemetery at 111th and Baseline, about 20 feet south of the City Park road and 70 feet east of 111th. See 40°0′5.019″N 105°5′33.8″W.
