= Lars Grimsrud =

Norwegian-American engineer

Lars Grimsrud is a retired aerospace engineer and performance automobile enthusiast who has become a celebrity amongst owners of carbureted Chevrolet Corvettes and GM muscle cars for his skill at tuning their engines.

Lars Grimsrud was born in Norway. Prior to his retirement in 2018, he made a living in Aerospace Engineering and has a background in General Aviation. He was an instructor at the GM Training Center in the 1970s.

Grimsrud was an original founder and president of the GTO Association of America (ref. Who's Who in the Midwest), and contributed technical articles as the editor of The Legend magazine.

Grimsrud later became known for his travels from his home in Lafayette, Colorado, to hold technical seminars for ad hoc groups of Corvette forum members. He has been featured by The New York Times for his unique "Tuning for Beer" tuning tours and seminars, which have taken him to over a dozen cities in North America, and once to Europe.

In addition to being in demand for these personal visits to groups of owners, who invited him to town for informal tuning sessions, he is widely quoted on hundreds of websites, has authored dozens of technical papers which are available at various websites on the Internet, and is also available to rebuild carburetors and distributors through the mail. His vehicles, work and technical articles have been featured by High Performance Pontiac Magazine, Musclecar Magazine, and by Musclecar Review.
