= Alicia Sanchez =

Latina activist

- Born: November 16, 1926; Louisville, Colorado, U.S.
- Died: March 11, 1985 (aged 58); Westminster, Colorado, U.S.
- Known for: Latina activist who founded the Clinica Campesina (Clinica Family Health)

Alicia Razo Juarez Sanchez (16 Nov 1926–11 Mar 1985) was a Latina activist who founded the Clinica Campesina (which became Clinica Family Health) in Lafayette, Colorado. Alicia Sanchez Elementary School in Lafayette is named after her. In 1977, she was named Boulder County Woman of the Year.

== Life and family ==
Alicia Juarez Sanchez was born on November 16, 1926, in Louisville, Colorado. She had lupus as a child, which left marks on her face. Later, she was a Lafayette resident and mother of seven children. Alicia Sanchez's daughter, Eleanor Montour, received the Boulder County Multicultural Award in 2013.

== Clinica Campesina Family Health Services ==
Clinica Campesina was founded in 1977 in the kitchen of Alicia Sanchez's wooden house in Lafayette, CO. The clinic began taking care of pregnant migrant women workers who worked in fields nearby and then cared for miners and agricultural workers. Clinica used a bedroom in the house for two exam rooms, microscope was in the kitchen, and strep cultures grew using a chicken-egg incubator given by a local farmer. In its first year, Clinica Campesina cared for 500 people.

Clinica Campesina eventually expanded its mission to serve the low-income Latino population near Denver. Spanish-speaking staff gave checkups, immunizations and prescriptions.

Today, the clinic is called Clinica Family Health. Clinica Family Health now serves about 55,000 patients each year and operates six community-based medical clinic. Clinica was part of the primary care revolution in 1998 with work on targeting diabetes and then, after 2000, the clinic redesigned its care model and became a patient-centered medical home, which focuses on continuity of care, quick access to care, and a team-based model of care. In 2018, the Lafayette Clinica facility moved from its South Boulder Road location to a large, new 2-story building on South Public Road.

== Legacy ==
Mi Mama, Alicia Sanchez: A Story Inspired by the Lives of Alicia Sanchez and Her Daughter Eleanor Montour is a bilingual Spanish and English book telling her story, written and illustrated by Andrea Baeza Breinbauer, Elizabeth (L.) LeNard, and Hannah Mook, in partnership with the Boulder County Latino History Project. Copies were distributed to every school library in St. Vrain and Boulder Valley School Districts, funded by CU Boulder and the Boulder County Latino History Project.

=== Alicia Sanchez Elementary School ===
In 1986, the new Alicia Sanchez International Elementary School was named in honor of her contributions to the community.

=== Alicia Sanchez Community Service Awards ===
In 2013, the first Alicia Sanchez Community Service Awards were given to three local volunteers in recognition of their service. They were presented by State Sen. Rollie Heath, D-Boulder, who had known Sanchez.
