= Mary Miller (Colorado businesswoman) =

American businessperson (1843–1921)

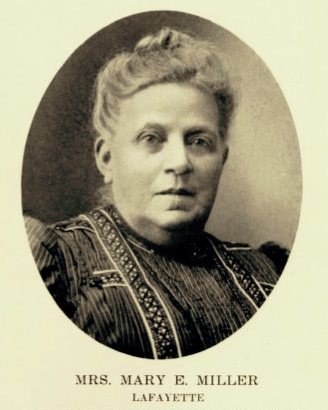
Mary E. Miller, Representative Women of Colorado, 1914

Mary E. Miller (1843–1921) settled in the Territory of Colorado in 1863 with her husband, Lafayette Miller. After her husband died, she founded the town of Lafayette, Colorado, named for her husband. Miller was called the "Mother of Lafayette. She was the first woman bank president in the United States, a philanthropist and an astute businesswoman.

In 2002, she was inducted into the Colorado Women's Hall of Fame, having noted: "Her financial acumen and business leadership helped Lafayette flourish and increased respect for women in business."

== Early life ==
Mary Elizabeth Foote, nicknamed "Molly", was born in Geneseo, New York on August 3, 1843. Her parents were John B. Foote from Massachusetts and Sarah "Sallie" Cole, who was from New York. Her father was a hotelier and a successful miner during the California Gold Rush. Both of her parents were Episcopalians and she became interested in Christian temperance as a child.

Mary grew up in Hastings, Michigan and Independence, Iowa She married Lafayette Miller, who preferred the nickname "Lafe," on December 24, 1862, in Quasqueton of Buchanan County, Iowa. Lafayette was born on March 18, 1840, one of eleven children born to Mary Ann Able and John Miller, a physician. He grew up in Buchanan County and graduated from Western College in Toledo, Iowa. After their marriage, Lafayette and Mary left Iowa to take advantage of the Homestead Act that promised 160 acres of unoccupied public land. The Millers joined a 50-wagon caravan on June 1, 1863, and traveled to Colorado in three or six covered wagons to Colorado. With them, they brought the region's first threshing machine and had twelve yoke of oxen. They traveled along the Smoky Hill Trail from Missouri to the Territory of Colorado. A couple of times they came under attack by Arapaho and Cheyenne. The Colorado War began within two months of their arrival in Colorado.

== Colorado pioneer ==
=== Early years ===
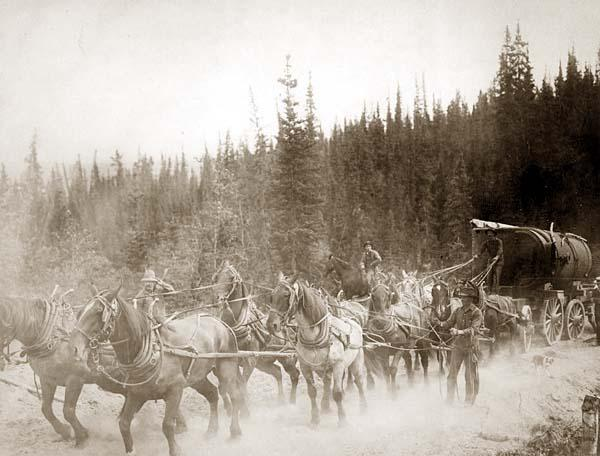
Horse team on the Overland Trail

In September 1863, they settled along the St. Vrain Creek in Burlington (now Longmont) and lived in a log cabin. In 1865, the Millers moved to land patented by Mary Miller's brother, James B. Foote along Rock Creek in the area around the present-day Rock Creek Farm, near the intersection of Highway 287 and Dillon Road south of the present-day town of Lafayette. Together they purchased the Rock Creek House (later called the Miller Tavern) from Thomas J. Lindsey in 1865. Lindsey acquired the tavern from "Dr. Dow" and built a hotel next to Rock Creek House in 1863. They also established a cattle ranch, farm, and orchard. The Miller Tavern, which Mary Miller described as a "road house" (a drinking establishment) in a November 29, 1912, interview in the Boulder County Miner, was located on the Cherokee Trail along the Denver-Cheyenne route of Ben Holladay's Overland Mail and Express Company, which later became Wells Fargo Mail's stagecoach line. Wells Fargo historians state that the Rock Creek House was never an official stop on the Overland or Wells Fargo stage line, but the stage coach may have stopped from time to time to offload passengers. According to Boulder County Commissioners' minutes of the July 3, 1866, meeting, Lafayette Miller and Thomas Lindsey were granted a saloon license for Rock Creek House, which required a $500 bond and a $50 annual renewal fee. The three entrepreneurs and saloon owners – Lafayette, Mary, and James B. Foote – also sold butter and eggs in Black Hawk.

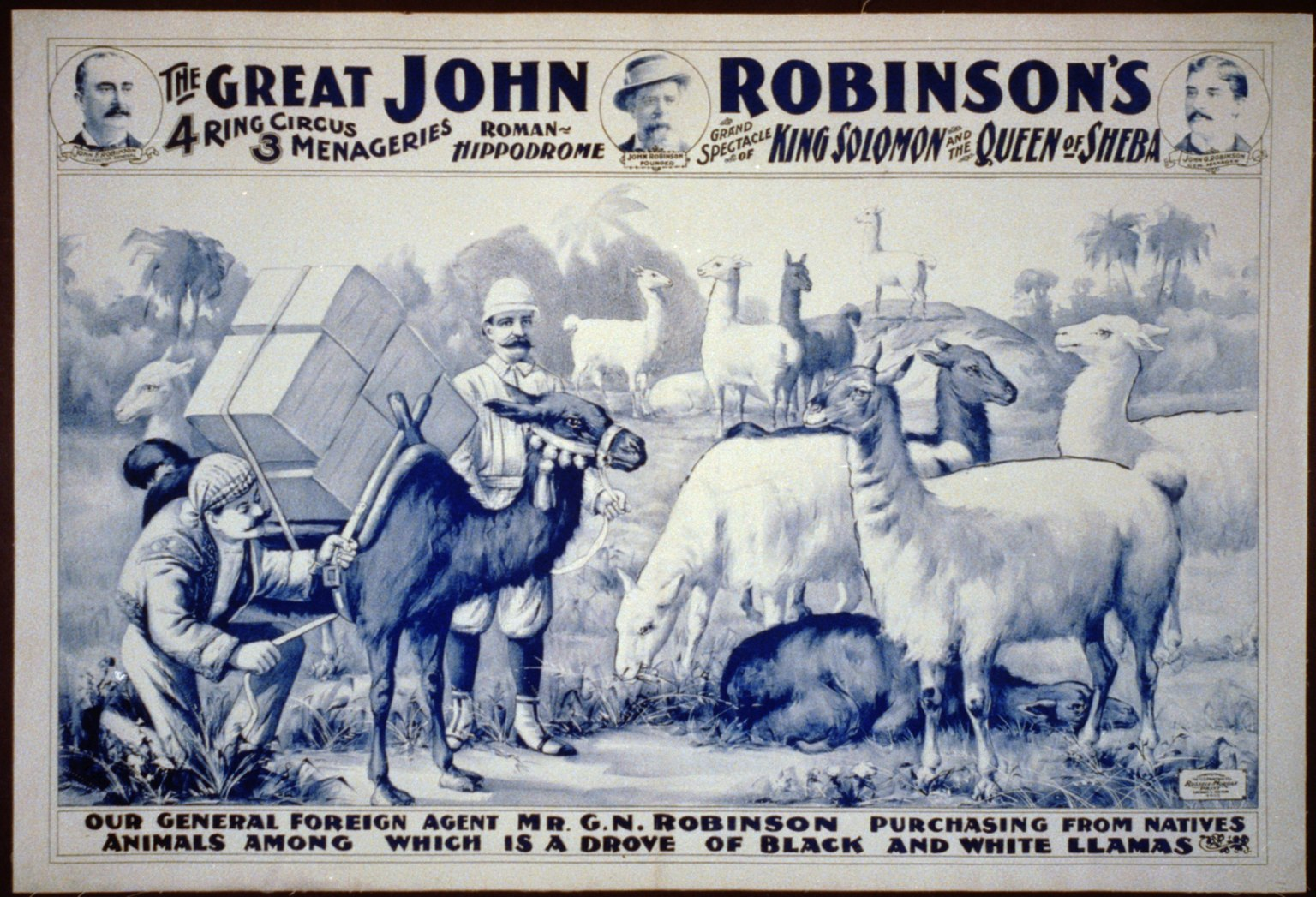
Poster for John Robinson Circus, 1900, Library of Congress

The Rock Creek House served long distance travelers and freighters, and those traveling from Fort Collins to Denver for shopping excursions. Modern narratives state that when he was the Commanding General of the U.S. Army, Ulysses S. Grant stopped at Rock Creek House. In a 1912 interview, Mary Miller stated that in 1868 Ulysses S. Grant instead stopped at White Rock stage station 8 miles north of Rock Creek House to "drink from the old well." In 1867 or 1869, she fed a 100-person troupe with the John Robinson Circus. She fed hot biscuits, canned vegetables, and milk to the first circus performers to visit Colorado. (Note: According to her grandson, Frank Miller, the circus camped nearby and she made 100 apple pies in one day and sold them to the troupe members.) (Note: According to her grandson, Ralph Clinton Miller, Mary served biscuits to the circus troupe and years later made and sold 100 apple pies in one day to military troops camping near the Miller Farm.)

In March 1868, the Millers purchased 160 acres along Coal Creek, two miles north of Rock Creek House, for $500 from Denver coal speculators Francis P. Heatley and Edward Chase. This land would eventually become the town of Lafayette and was adjacent to 240 acres patented by Mary Miller's brothers, James B. and Samuel G. Foote, and her father, John B. Foote. Mary eventually acquired most of the 640 acres in Section 2, Township 1 South, Range 69 West. The farm was called Willow Glen Farm. The Willow Glen School was established in 1875 in the Coal Creek area and the Miller children attended the school from that time onward. Lafayette was one of the people that established the school.

In 1868, Wells Fargo abandoned its stage stop at Church Ranch five miles south of Rock Creek house, and in 1869 sold its Denver to Cheyenne route, which was acquired by John Hughes. The construction of the Colorado Central Railroad meant that regional stagecoach service became less frequent. With the writing on the wall, in 1871 Millers and James B. Foote sold the Miller Tavern to Abner C. Goodhue. They resided to Erie for a short time, then moved to Boulder. In 1875, Wells Fargo stopped the rest of its stagecoach service. In the mid-1870s, Lafayette was an owner of two butcher shops and a liquor distributorship. He opened a butcher shop in Boulder on 14th Street with his brother-in-law, James B. Foote, and he built a retail store and opened another in Erie. The Millers owned a house in Boulder on Water Street, now Canyon Street. The men were town trustees there and Mary served on the school board. Mary may have run the farm and ranch while Lafayette ran the butcher shops, because the Miller children attended the Willow Glen School near their farm during this period.

After her husband died in 1878, Miller ran the ranch with her six children. She had more than 100 head of cattle and horses and some pigs. She grew wheat, hay, corn, and oats on the land. She also produced raspberries, gooseberries, currents and grapes. (Note: Snodgrass says that she moved to a place called Willow Glen, south of Denver, but she lived on the ranch that the family called Willow Glen.)

=== Coal mining ===
A vast coal vein was found in an area that included the Miller ranch in the mid-1870s. Having retained the mineral rights, she leased coal rights to coal prospector John H. Simpson, a British engineer from Cumberland who opened the Simpson Mine in 1888. She received 12.5 cents per ton in royalties for the lump coal that was mined on her property, and became wealthy from the mine's earnings. In January 1895, when a severe cold weather snap hit the Eastern Plains of Colorado, she secured from the Simpson Mine and shipped 175 railroad cars filled with donated coal.

=== Town of Lafayette ===
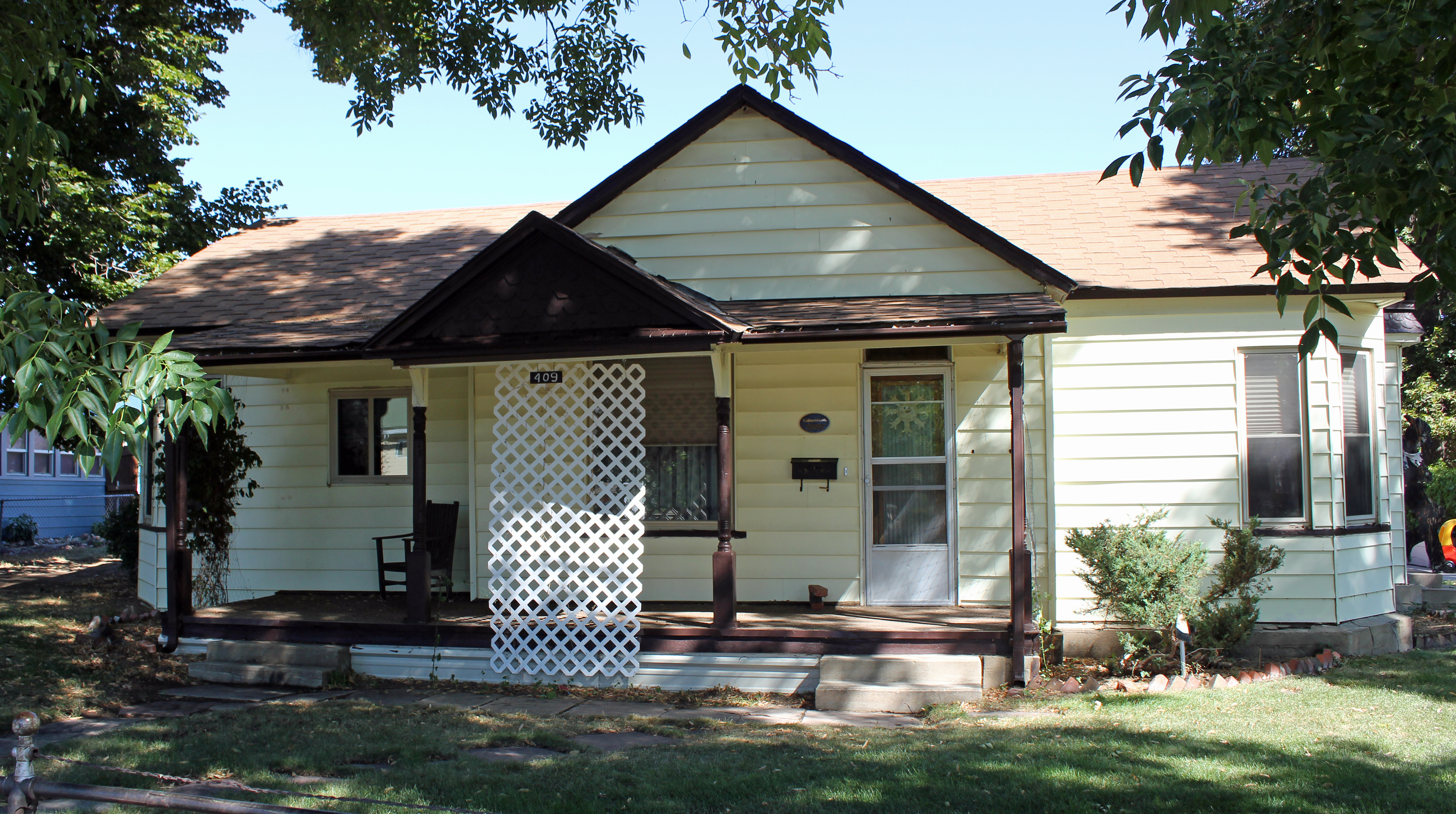
Miller House, 409 East Cleveland Street in Lafayette, was listed on the National Register of Historic Places in 1983.

Boulder County Clerk and Recorder records show that on February 3, 1888, Mary Miller filed the first plat for the original 37-acre town of Lafayette, having subdivided part of her land into 144 commercial and residential lots. In 1889, Mary Miller replatted the town of Lafayette and created 353 lots on 89 acres. From 1888 to 1904, Mary Miller sold 190 Lafayette lots, 50 of them to women for as little as $1. Boulder County property records show Old Town lots, 50 feet by 140 feet, sold to men at an average price of about $90. The purchase price for lots sold to women averaged about $48. Deeds for the lots prohibited selling or giving away "spiritous, vinous or malt liquors," which remained in effect until the early 1980s. The first houses were built in July 1888 in what is now called Old Town, located between Baseline Road and Emma Street and east of Public Road. The town was incorporated on November 9, 1889, and her son Thomas became its first mayor. (Note: The streets were named for places of significance to Miller. Geneseo was her birthplace, Michigan for where she was raised, Iowa for where she was married, and Simpson for the mine she opened. A few of the other streets were for people that were significant in her life, including national temperance leaders John B. Gough and John B. Finch. Foote was her maiden name, Emma was her niece and Chester for President Arthur Chester.) She built a house in Lafayette and operated a school in her house on East Cleveland Street until she founded the town's first school. She established more neighborhoods in the town after subdividing more of her land.

External image
- 1900 map of Lafayette

Using coal royalties and land sales proceeds, Mary Miller founded Lafayette Bank and Trust Company, also known as the Miller Bank, in 1900. It was the second bank she’d help form in the town, the first being the Farmers’ & Miners’ State Bank, which opened in 1892 and closed in 1894. Mary Miller's partners in the Farmers’ & Miners’ State Bank were S.T. Hooper, C.C. Brown and G.C. Seaman. She established the Lafayette Bank and Trust Company with three of her sons – Charles, Thomas, and James – and was its president for many years. Although modern narratives state that Mary Miller was the first bank president "in the world," the story originates in a December 13, 1902, article in the Lafayette News which states that she was "the only woman in the United States known to be the president of a bank." When miners went on strike, she deferred their mortgage payments and bought groceries for their miner's families. In 1914, the bank closed after giving a $90,000 loan to the United Mine Workers, which was not repaid. But United Mine Workers officials stated in 1916 that they'd deposited $41,565.50 at the Lafayette bank and that the money was missing.

News accounts published in Denver newspapers in 1915 helped clarify the closing of the Lafayette Bank and Trust. While Mary Miller was president of the bank, the Lafayette bank merged with the Louisville bank in December 1914. In early 1915, the banks were seized by state regulators and closed. A grand jury empaneled to investigate the closure stated that both banks "had been in appalling condition for a long time prior to the consolidation or merger, which was entered into on Dec. 12, 1914, but it particularly shows that while the Louisville bank was hopelessly insolvent, the Lafayette Bank and Trust Company was in far worse condition." The grand jury found that the Lafayette bank had defrauded depositors and handed down two indictments for false reporting against Mary Miller, but the indictment was never enforced because the Boulder district attorney never signed the paperwork.

In 1905–06, Mary Miller helped finance and manage a new flour mill, the Lafayette-Louisville Milling & Grain Company. Her partners for the new venture included son, James P. Miller, George Bermont, W.A. Burke, William Padfield, John Lipsey, Dr. Horace R. Burns, P.M. Peltier, J.O. Van Debergh and Denver businessman E.L. Milner who was the general manager of the mill. The mill was located on a Burlington railroad spur built for the mill in the 800 block of E. Baseline Road, about 200 feet west of today's Lafayette Feed and Grain elevator. W.F. Wehman sold his grist mill to Lafayette-Louisville Milling & Grain Company in June 1905, about nine months before the new mill opened. The Milling & Grain Company flour mill produced its premium brand Silver Tip Flour and operated primarily on electricity provided by the Interurban Power Plant, one of the nation's first distributed power systems built on land that Mary Miller owned at today's Waneka Lake. Mary Miller sponsored a contest to name the premium brand flour in September 1905. The prize was 300 pounds of flour. Company ledgers show that Silver Tip Flour sold for about 12 cents per pound in 1906 and 1907. The Lafayette-Louisville Milling & Grain Company mill closed in the 1920s and burned down in 1935.

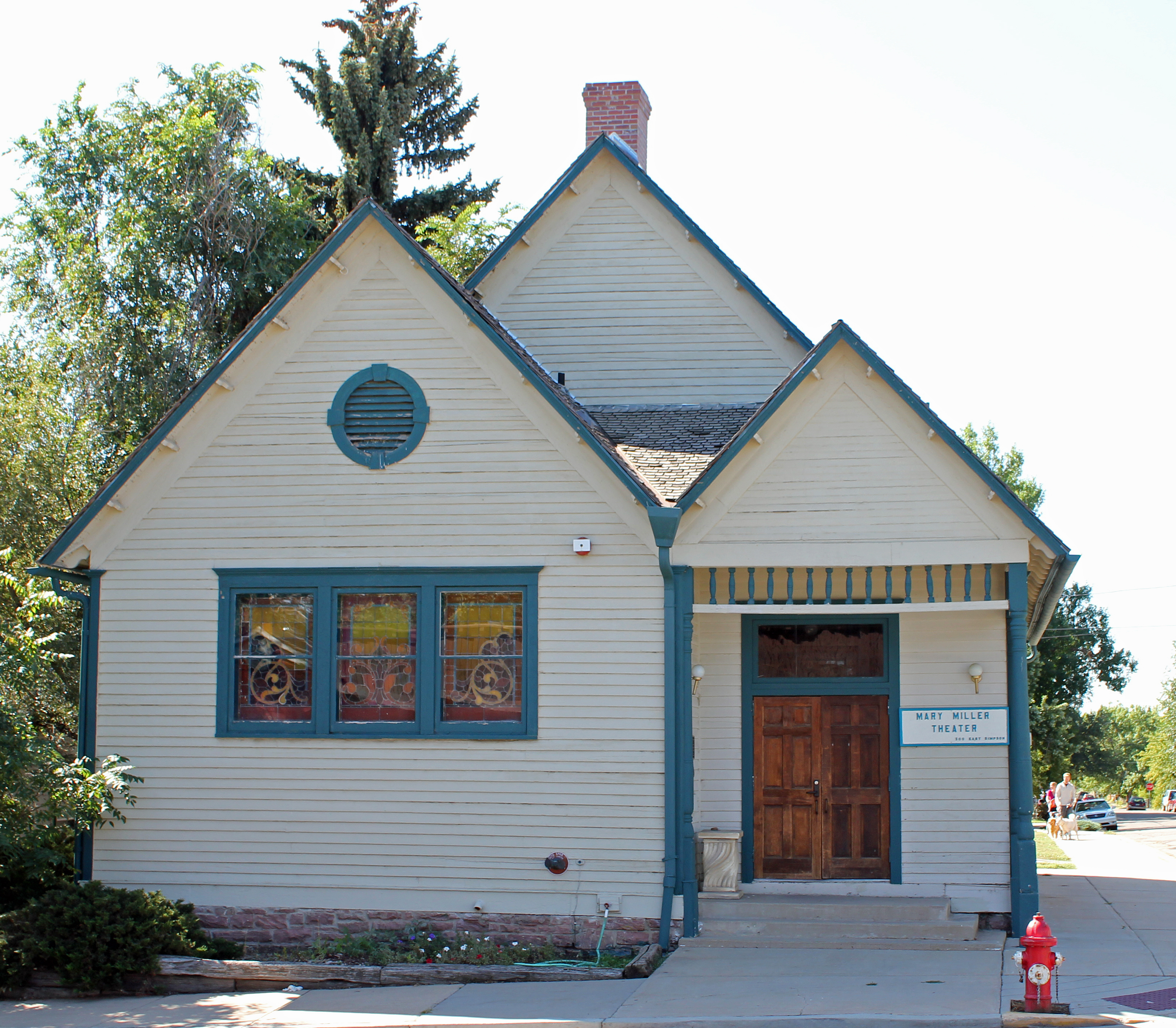
Congregational Church, Lafayette, Colorado was founded in 1890. Miller provided most of the funds to establish the church, arranged for its construction, and paid the minister's salary for several years. It was the Mary Miller Theater and as of November 6, 2023 its name was changed to Arapaho Center.

Mary Miller paid for the construction of the Congregational Church, which was established in 1890 by John and Annie Jones, Mr. and Mrs. J. M. Van Deren and Laura Kimbark. Mary Miller helped other churches obtain land for their churches and established the first school. She also helped organize local clubs and organizations, like the Order of the Eastern Star. She ran for senator and state treasurer for the Prohibition Party in 1900. She became president of School District No. 43, which later became the Broomfield School District.

== Personal life ==
During their marriage, the Millers had six children. On May 28, 1878, her husband died at age 38 and obituaries attributed his death to "Bright's Disease of the kidneys coupled with derangement of the liver" (derangement being a respectful term used at the time to describe cirrhosis of the liver due to overconsumption of alcohol). After Lafayette's death, Mary ran the ranch. In 1887, her eleven-year-old son, Frank, died due to an illness. Her daughter Amelia died when she was twelve years old. She then had four sons, George, James, Thomas, and Charles. James attended University of Colorado and became an attorney and vice president of the bank. George established Lafayette Supply Company and was a farmer. Thomas became Lafayette's mayor and died in 1902 in a mining accident. The history and legacy of Mary Miller and early Lafayette are documented and interpreted by the Lafayette History Museum, which preserves archival materials, photographs, and local artifacts related to the town's development.

Miller died on November 14, 1921. Rebecca Schwendler, chairwoman of the Lafayette Historic Preservation Board states, "It was remarkable what she did at a time when women didn't have very much of a voice... She had a business side and a soft side."

== Places named for her ==
- The Mary Miller trail, which goes around part of Stearns Lake in Lafayette.
