= Lafayette History Museum =

Local history museum in Lafayette, Colorado

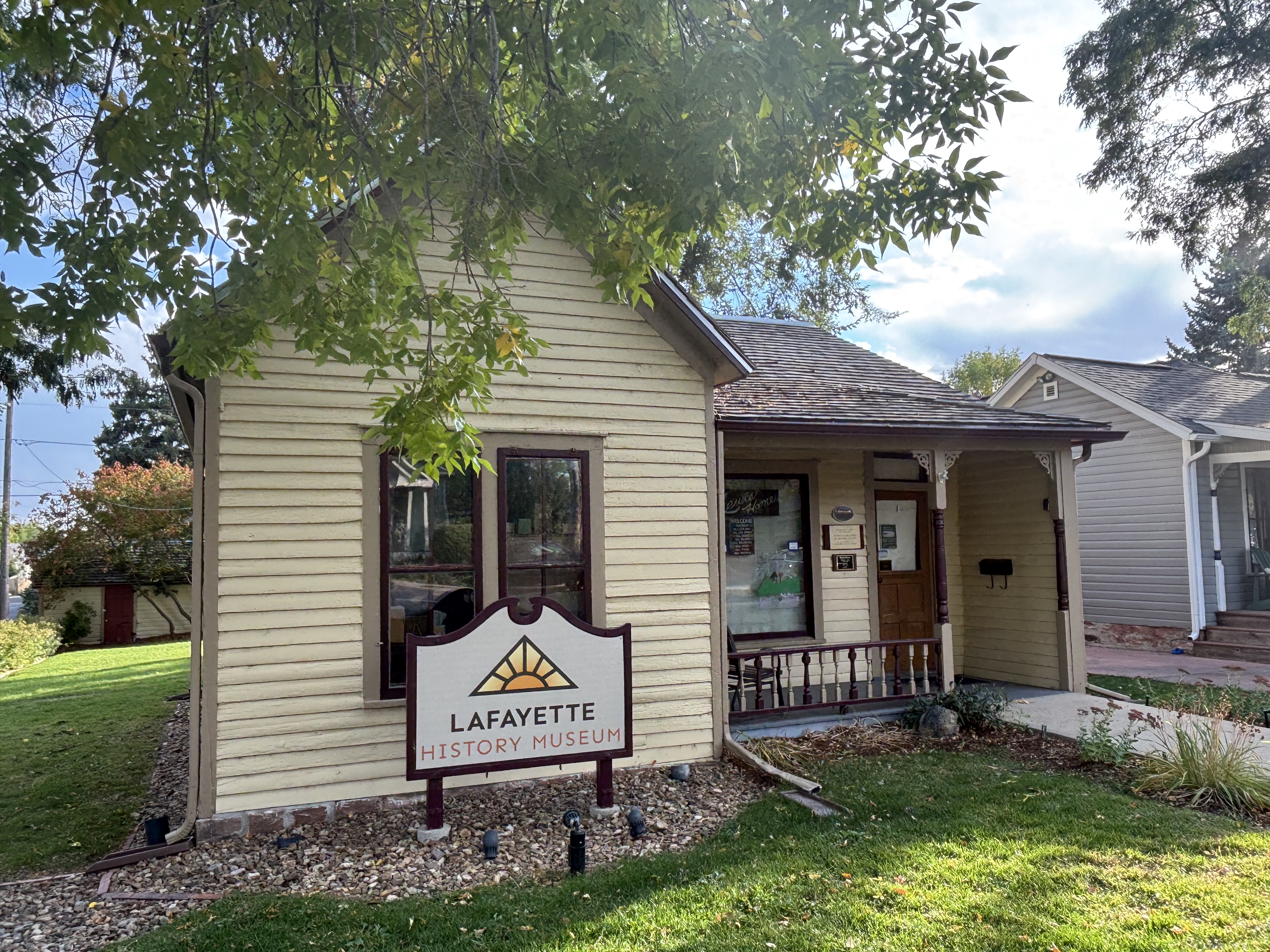
- Photograph of the exterior of the Lafayette History Museum building in October 2024.
- Former name: Lafayette Miners Museum
- Established: 1976 (50 years ago)
- Location: Lafayette, Colorado
- Coordinates: 39°59′53″N 105°05′22″W
- Type: Local history museum
- Collections: Louis Gaz Map Collection, Schofield Farm Collection
- Collection size: 6,000 items
- Visitors: 3,006 (2025)
- Director: Chelsea Pennington Hahn
- President: Mike Pascoe
- Public transit access: N Public Rd & W Geneseo St, Regional Transportation District
- Parking: On site (no charge)
- Website: lafayettehistoricalsociety.org

The Lafayette History Museum, formerly known as the Lafayette Miners Museum, is a local history museum in Lafayette, Colorado, United States. Established in 1976 and housed in a historic miner's cottage, the museum is dedicated to preserving and interpreting the cultural and historical heritage of Lafayette, with a strong emphasis on its coal mining legacy, early settlement, and community life.

== History ==
The museum is housed in the historic Lewis House, a miner's cottage originally constructed in the 1890s at the Gladstone Mine site northeast of Lafayette. After the mine ceased operations, the house was moved to its current location at 108 East Simpson Street in Lafayette's Old Town district between 1905 and 1908. The building served as a private residence until 1975, when Hannah Lewis, the last occupant, passed away at the age of 95.

In 1976, the Lafayette Historical Society converted the house into the Lafayette Miners Museum, focusing on the town's coal mining history. The museum's founding coincided with the United States Bicentennial celebrations and marked a renewed effort to preserve local heritage.

In 2022, the museum was renamed the Lafayette History Museum to reflect an expanded mission that includes other aspects of Lafayette's history, such as agriculture, education, domestic life, and civic development.

In 2026, the museum received a $50,000 grant from History Colorado to support preparation of planning documents for preservation work of the Lewis House.

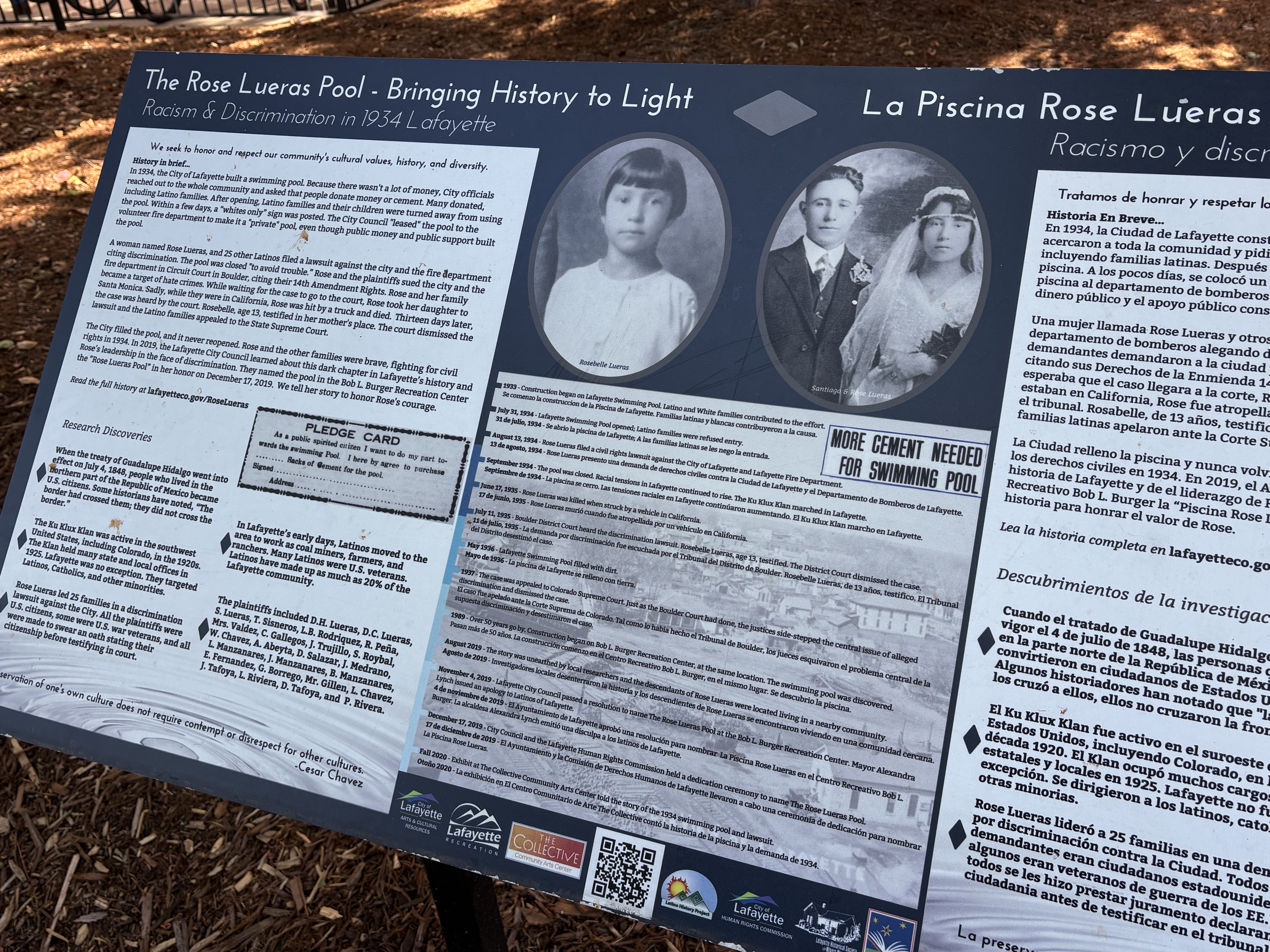
Historical marker in Lafayette, Colorado, commemorating Rose Lueras and the 1934 fight against racial discrimination at the city swimming pool.

== Exhibits and collections ==
The museum's permanent exhibits focus on different facets of Lafayette's historical development:

- Coal Mining Heritage: Displays include mining tools, helmets, and historical artifacts, illustrating the significance of coal mining in shaping Lafayette's economy and community
- 1920s Kitchen: A recreated domestic interior offering insight into everyday life during the early 20th century
- Outdoor Exhibits: The museum grounds display original mining, blacksmithing, and farming equipment, along with a vintage outhouse, reflecting the agricultural and industrial background of the town

Rotating and special exhibits highlight various themes, including the contributions of women and immigrant communities, the impact of local businesses, and evolving civic identity:

- New Views of Lafayette: Explores aerial versions of the town over time with Sanborn Fire Insurance maps, and scale models of notable buildings constructed by Thomas Knill
- Radical Lafayette: The Colorado Coal Strike of 1927-1928: Explores the tensions between the owners of the Columbine Mine strike police and protestors, which came to a violent head on November 21, 1927

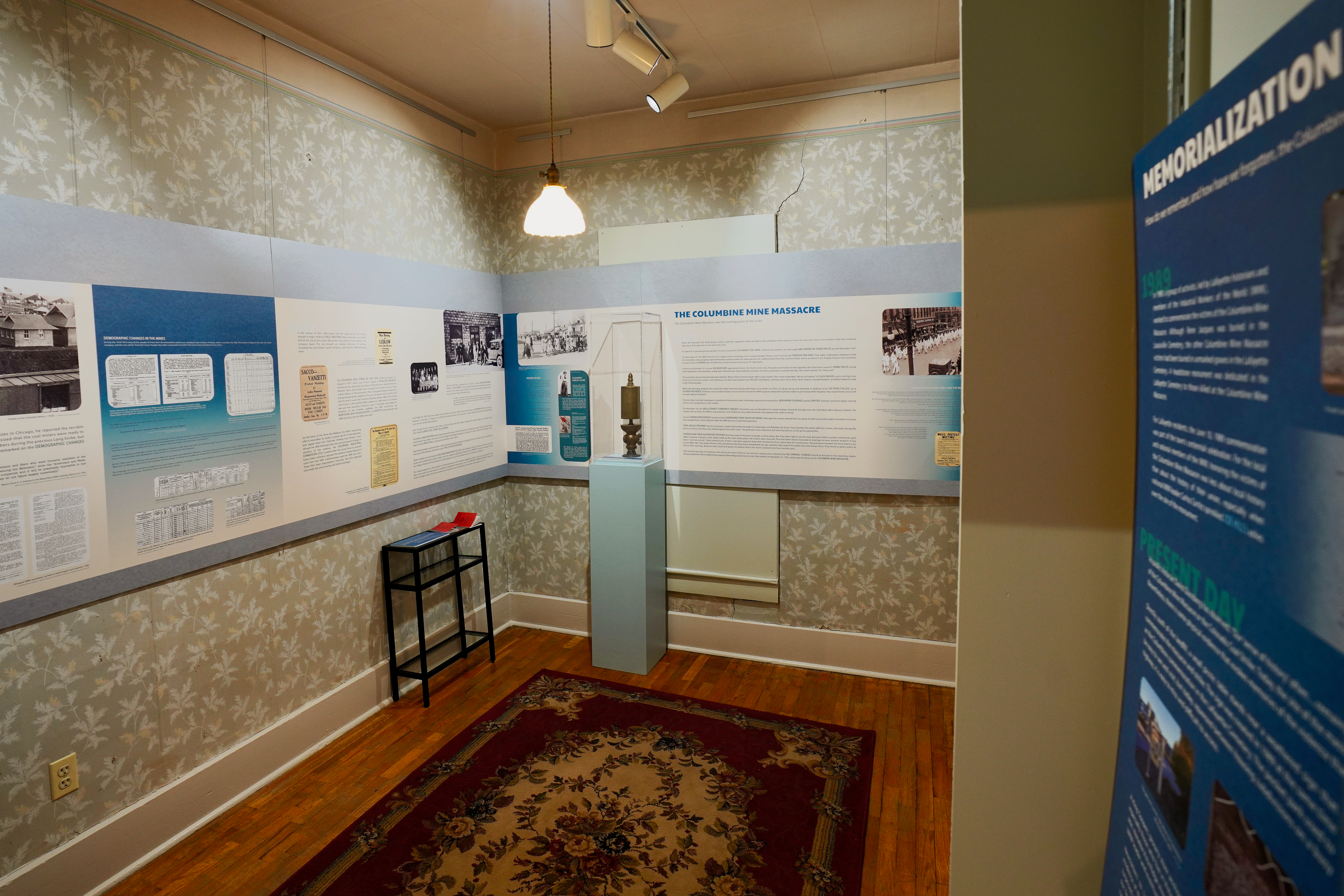
Exhibit at the Lafayette History Museum in Lafayette, Colorado, interpreting the 1927 Columbine Mine massacre with photographs, documents, and artifacts.

The museum also documents local folklore, including the legend of the "Lafayette Vampire", associated with miner Teodor Glava, who was buried in Lafayette Cemetery in 1918. According to a 2015 report by KUSA-TV (9News Denver), museum staff have interpreted the story as a blend of myth and local tradition that reflects the town's coal mining immigrant history.

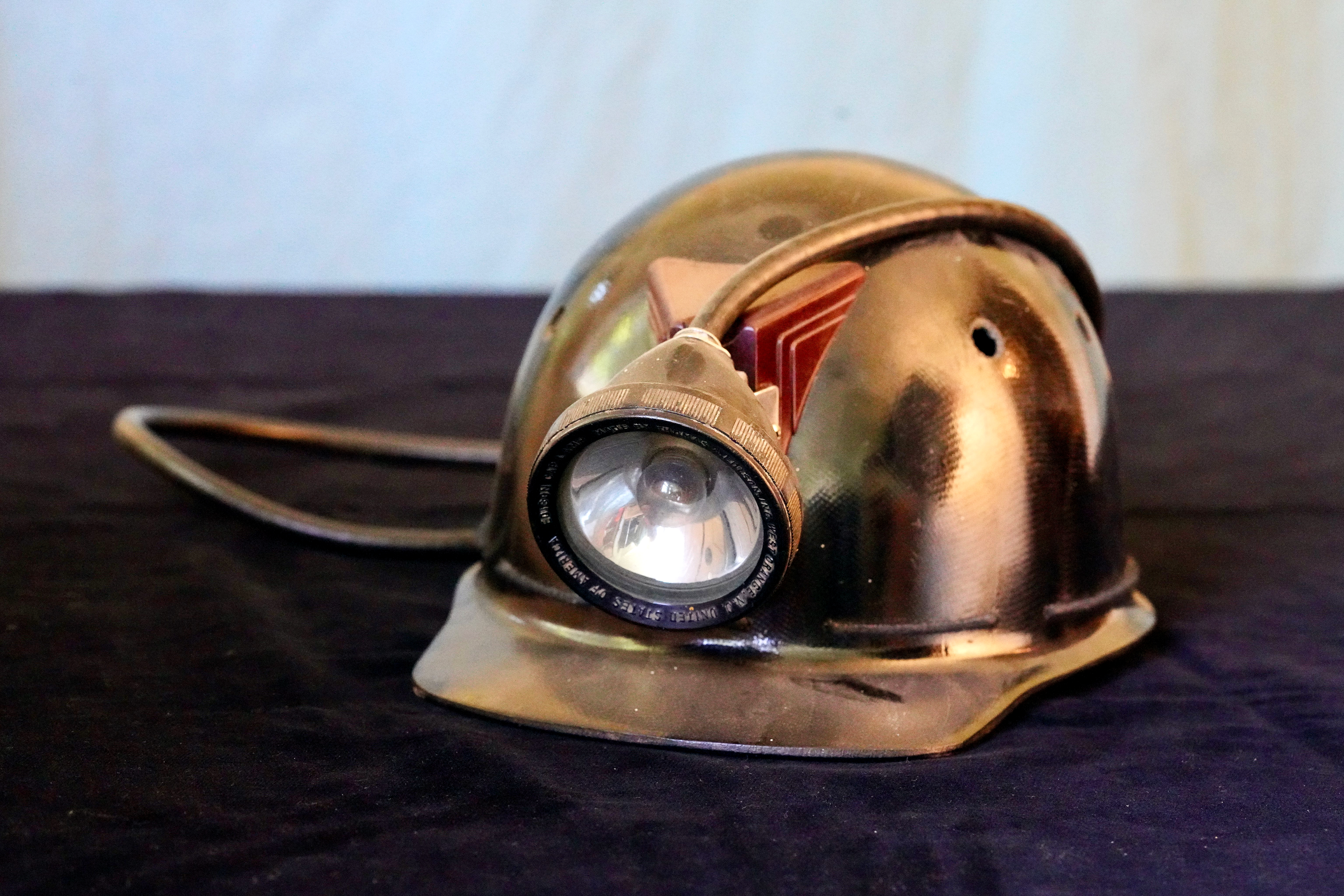
Coal miner's hard hat with electric headlamp, used for underground mining work.

== Programs and outreach ==
The museum plays an active role in community education and engagement. Programs include:

- Guided walking tours of historic Old Town Lafayette (by appointment)
- Educational programming for schools and community groups
- Collaborations with other local heritage and arts organizations
- Online Collections Database, which offers digital access to historic photographs, documents, and artifacts relevant to Lafayette's development.
- Way Back Whensday, objects from the museum's collections are brought to local children's museums (e.g., WOW! Children's Museum) for exploration

On February 4, 1989, the Lafayette Historical Society commemorated the centennial anniversary of the founding of Lafayette and its first post office. The society made available commemorative envelopes bearing a special Centennial Station cancellation.

The museum has also supported historical research by authors and community historians. For example, George Ogle credited the museum as a major resource in his collection Stories from the Colorado Coal Mines, a work of historical fiction drawing on events such as the Ludlow Massacre, the Columbine Mine massacre, and the experiences of Japanese immigrant workers in Colorado's coal mining communities.

Beginning in 2023, the museum collaborated with the City of Lafayette on the development of a memorial plaque for the Lafayette Cemetery to recognize individuals buried in unmarked graves. Museum staff worked with local residents to conduct historical research and write the plaque text, which was later approved by the Lafayette City Council in 2025. The plaque was installed in October 2025.

== Governance and operations ==
The Lafayette History Museum is operated by the Lafayette Historical Society, an independent 501(c)(3) nonprofit organization. The museum receives annual funding from the City of Lafayette, primarily generated by Ordinance No. 58, Series 2017, which enacted a 3.5 percent excise tax on commercial storage spaces and whose proceeds help fund local arts, culture, and history organizations. It retains its own governance, curatorial independence, and decision-making authority. Additional support comes from donations, grants, and fundraising efforts. Volunteers play an essential role in staffing and organizing museum events.

In 2023, the Institute of Museum and Library Services (IMLS) granted the museum $50,000 through the Inspire! Grant for Small Museums program to support a comprehensive inventory and preservation of its coal mining map collection.

== Community role and historical research ==
In 2023, the museum contributed historical expertise to local reporting on the rediscovery of the Hi-Way Food Store facade during renovations in Old Town Lafayette. Museum director Chelsea Pennington Hahn provided background on the building's origins, including its 1908 construction by Ernest Johnson, subsequent relocation to South Public Road by John Gordon, and later uses as a food market, electronics store, and most recently the Cannon Mine Coffee shop.

== Awards ==
- 2024, Excellence in Historic Preservation Award, Daughters of the American Revolution, Indian Peaks Chapter

== See also ==
- Lafayette, Colorado
- History of Colorado
- Coal mining in Colorado
- List of museums in Colorado
- Lewis House (Lafayette, Colorado)
