= Edward Doyle (labor activist) =

Colorado miner (1886–1954)

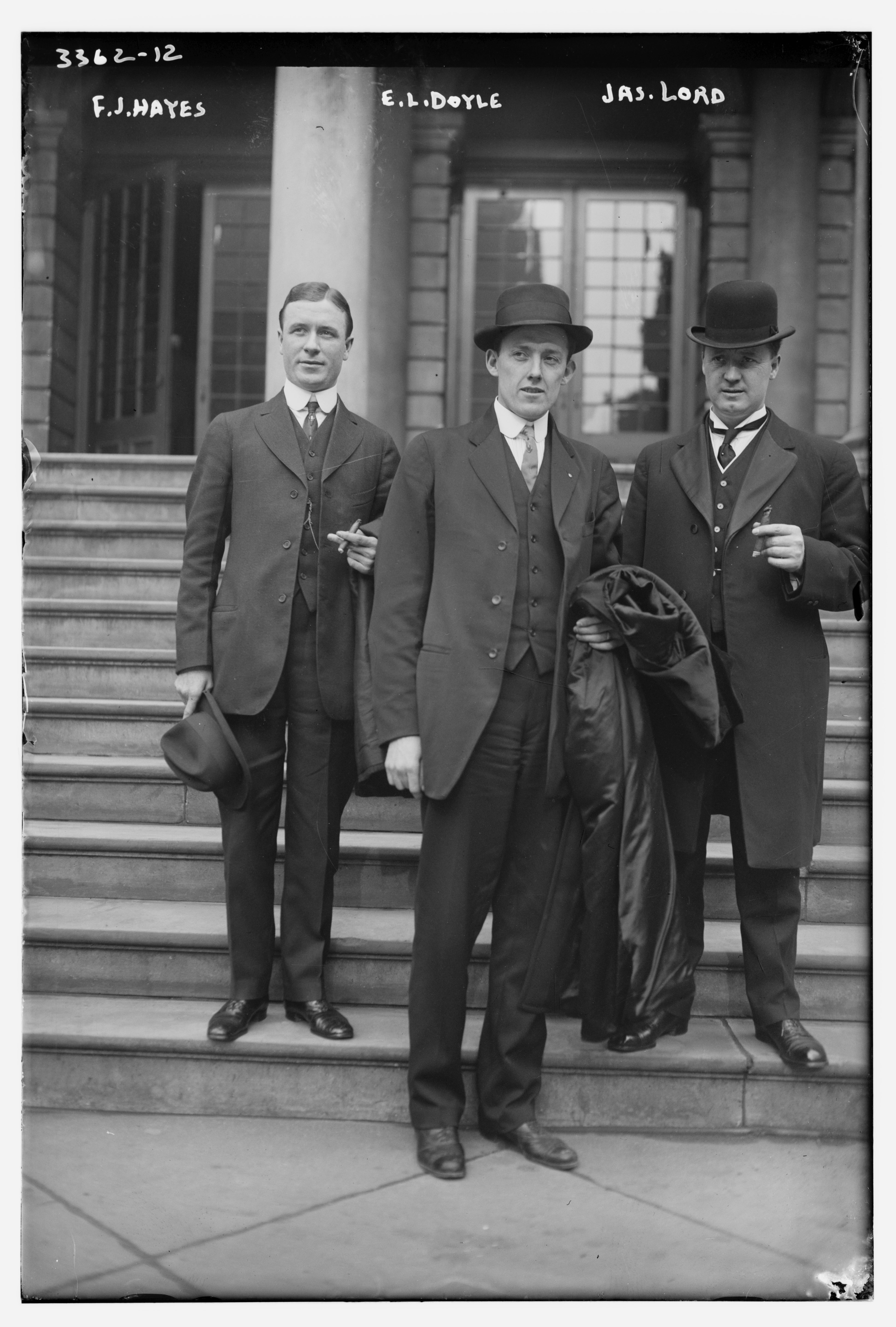
Doyle (center), with Frank Hayes (left, President of the United Mine Workers of America), James Revell Lord (right, miner and union official)

Edward Lawrence Doyle (1886–1954) was a labor unionist and miner in Colorado.

From 1912 to 1917 he served as Secretary-Treasurer for District 15 of the United Mine Workers of America. He is known for his role as a union spokesperson in the Ludlow Massacre, a 1914 mass killing perpetrated by anti-striker militia during the Colorado Coalfield War.
