= Lafayette, Colorado =

City in Colorado, United States

- Home rule municipality
- City of Lafayette
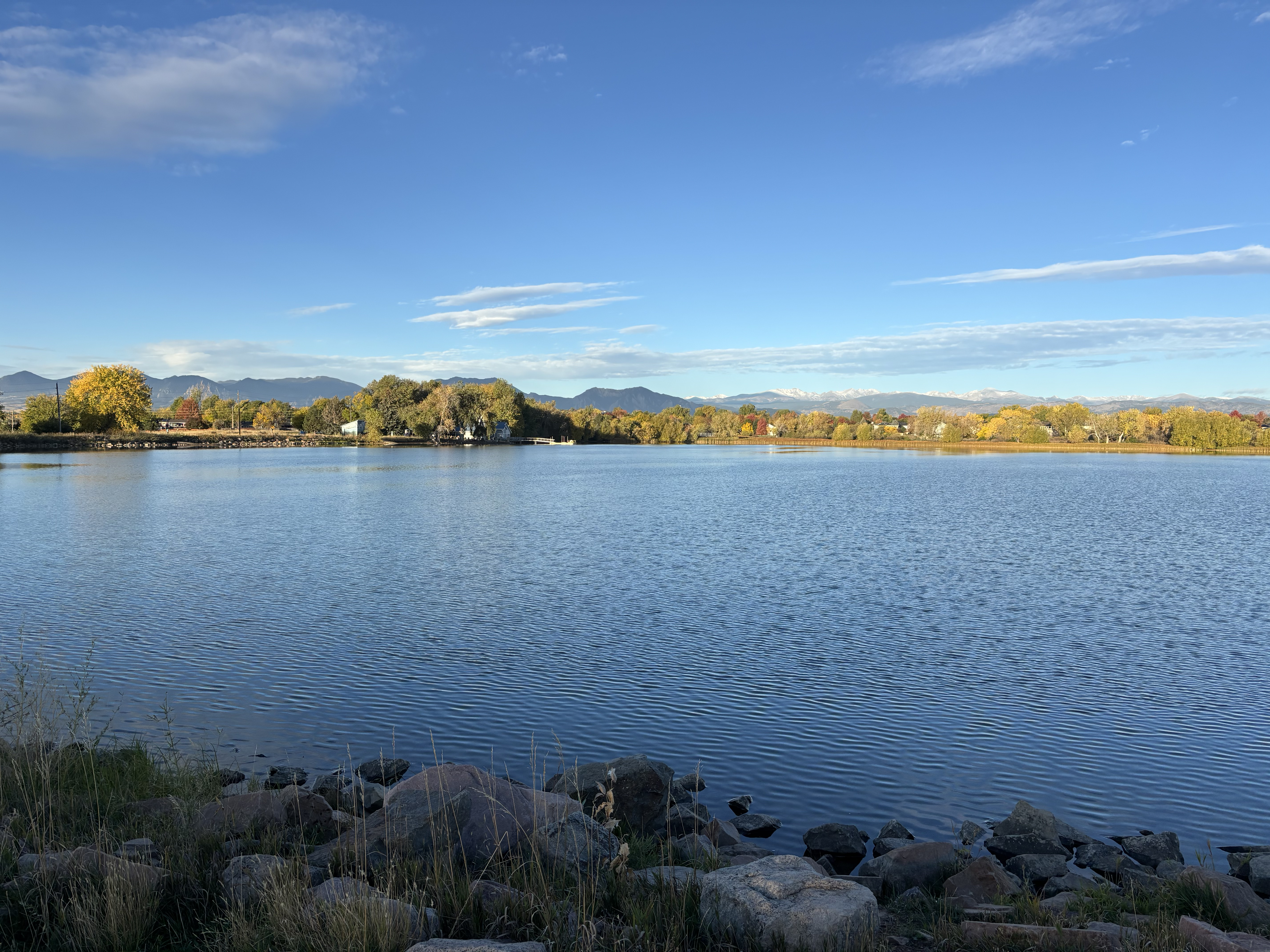
- View across Waneka Lake from the east shore in Lafayette, Colorado, with autumn foliage and the snowcapped Front Range on the horizon.

- Location of the City of Lafayette in Boulder County, Colorado
- Coordinates: 40°00′12″N 105°06′25″W
- Country: United States
- State: Colorado
- County: Boulder County
- City: Lafayette
- Founded: 1888
- Incorporated: January 6, 1890
- Named for: Lafayette Miller

Government
  - Type: Home Rule Municipality
  - Mayor: Saul Tapia Vega
  - Mayor Pro Tem: Tim Barnes
  - City Administrator: Kady Doelling

Area
  - Total: 9.41 sq mi (24.38 km^{2})
  - Land: 9.21 sq mi (23.86 km^{2})
  - Water: 0.20 sq mi (0.52 km^{2})
- Elevation: 5,266 ft (1,605 m)

Population (2020)
  - Total: 30,411
  - Density: 3,301/sq mi (1,275/km^{2})
- Time zone: UTC−7 (MST)
  - Summer (DST): UTC−6 (MDT)
- ZIP code: 80026
- Area codes: Both 303 and 720
- FIPS code: 08-41835
- GNIS feature ID: 2411592
- Highways: US 287, SH 7, SH 42, NW Parkway
- Website: lafayetteco.gov

The City of Lafayette (/ˌlɑːfiˈɛt, ˌlæf-/ LA(H)F-ee-ET) is a home rule municipality located in southeastern Boulder County, Colorado, United States. The city population was 30,411 at the 2020 United States census.

== Geography ==
Lafayette is located in southeastern Boulder County. It is bordered by the town of Erie to the north and east, by the city of Broomfield to the east and south, and by Louisville to the southwest. U.S. Highway 287 is the main road through the city, leading north to Longmont and south to Broomfield and Denver. State Highway 7 leads east from Lafayette to Brighton and west to Boulder. Exit number 229 off of Interstate 25 provides access to the city.

According to the United States Census Bureau, Lafayette has a total area of 9.3 square miles (24 km^{2}), of which 9.3 square miles (24 km^{2}) is land and 0.15 square miles (0.4 km^{2}), or 1.50%, is water.

Climate data for Lafayette, Colorado
Month	Jan	Feb	Mar	Apr	May	Jun	Jul	Aug	Sep	Oct	Nov	Dec	Year
Mean daily maximum °C (°F)	5 (41)	5 (41)	11 (52)	15 (59)	20 (68)	28 (82)	30 (86)	30 (86)	26 (79)	17 (63)	11 (52)	5 (41)	17 (63)
Daily mean °C (°F)	−3.4 (25.9)	−2.6 (27.3)	3.1 (37.6)	7.3 (45.1)	12.1 (53.8)	19.2 (66.6)	22.1 (71.8)	21.4 (70.5)	17.6 (63.7)	8.9 (48.0)	2.2 (36.0)	−3.4 (25.9)	8.7 (47.7)
Mean daily minimum °C (°F)	−8 (18)	−9 (16)	−4 (25)	0 (32)	5 (41)	11 (52)	14 (57)	14 (57)	10 (50)	3 (37)	−3 (27)	−8 (18)	2 (36)
Average precipitation mm (inches)	23 (0.9)	23 (0.9)	49 (1.9)	71 (2.8)	88 (3.5)	55 (2.2)	47 (1.9)	43 (1.7)	40 (1.6)	44 (1.7)	31 (1.2)	21 (0.8)	535 (21.1)
Average snowfall cm (inches)	19.6 (7.7)	30.5 (12.0)	25.9 (10.2)	23.1 (9.1)	6.1 (2.4)	0 (0)	0 (0)	0 (0)	0 (0)	13.2 (5.2)	17.5 (6.9)	29.2 (11.5)	165.1 (65)
Average precipitation days	4	4	6	8	10	7	6	6	4	5	4	4	68
Average relative humidity (%)	61	58	54	51	53	47	44	46	47	53	57	61	53
Mean daily sunshine hours	7.8	8.3	9.4	10	10.7	12.1	12.5	11.7	10.1	8.6	8.1	7.4	9.7
Average ultraviolet index	2	2	2	3	4	5	5	5	4	3	2	1	3
Source: Climate data.org(1991-2021) — WorldWeatherOnline(2009-2023) — Colorado Climate Center

== History ==
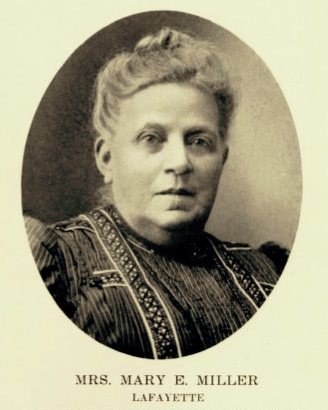
Mary E. Miller, Representative Women of Colorado, 1914

Lafayette was founded in 1888 by Mary E. Miller (née Foote). She filed the original Town of Lafayette plat in January 1888 and sold the first residential lot – Lot 6, Block G, Town of Lafayette – in March 1888 to Hugh Hughes. In February 1889, the Town of Lafayette was incorporated.

Mary Miller and her husband, Lafayette Miller, had moved to the area to farm land they had purchased in March 1868 from Denver coal speculators Francis P. Heatly and Edward Chase. The farm also included land acquired by Mary's brother, James B. Foote, and father, John B. Foote, via the Homestead Act in 1871. In 1874 the Millers moved to Boulder. Lafayette Miller ran a butcher shop and was a town trustee. Lafayette Miller died in Boulder in 1878, after which Mary Miller moved back to the farm with their six small children. In 1884 coal was discovered on the Miller farm, and in 1887 John H. Simpson acquired a coal lease from James B. Foote and sank the first Simpson Mine shaft, thereby starting the coal mining era. In 1888 Mary Miller designated 37 acres (0.15 km^{2}) of the farm for the town of Lafayette, which she named after her late husband. In July 1888 a second mine, the Cannon, went into operation and the first houses were built. Mary Miller submitted a revised 89 acres (0.36 km^{2}) plat for the town in 1889. Also in early 1889, Mary Miller leased the rights to mine coal for 12.5 cents per ton to Charles Spencer and John H. Simpson. The two commenced sinking the Spencer coal mine 200 yards west of the Simpson coal mine. On April 2, 1889, the town of Lafayette was incorporated. As stipulated in the original property deeds for the platting, no alcohol could be sold or distributed east of what is now known as Public Road. In 1904, the Lafayette Town Board mandated that the "alcohol clause" be added to all platted additions to Lafayette.

Lafayette quickly became a part of the coal-mining boom that all of eastern Boulder and southwestern Weld counties were experiencing, with the combined Spencer/Simpson mine being the largest and most productive. The Cannon floundered and failed to produce profitable quantities of coal. It closed in 1898. By 1914 Lafayette was a booming town with two banks and four hotels. Lafayette was also the location of one of the nation's first distributed electrical grids powered by the Interurban Power Plant that served Louisville, Boulder, Longmont, and Fort Collins.

Mary Miller continued to be a leader in the community, especially in January 1900, when the town's business district burned. She founded the Farmers’ & Miners’ State Bank with S.T. Hooper, C.C. Brown and G.C. Beaman in June 1892, which closed in August 1894. Mary Miller then formed the Lafayette Bank in 1900. She was elected president of the bank, and according to a Denver Post article reprinted in the Lafayette News and dated December 13, 1902, was "the only woman in the United States known to be president of a bank." The bank closed in 1914 because of roughly $90,000 in bad loans to the striking United Mine Workers. Mary Miller remained devoted to the temperance movement and eventually ran on the 1913 Prohibition Party ticket for the U.S. Senate seat won by Gov. John F. Shafroth. She also ran for the state treasurer seat on the Prohibition Party ticket. Miller died in 1921 at her daughter-in-law's home at 501 E. Cleveland Street.

Lafayette continued to thrive as a coal-mining town. Northern Coal Field miners, members of United Mine Workers, walked off the job in the aforementioned strike starting in April 1910. The United Mine Workers expanded the strike to all of Colorado in 1913. The Long Strike is nationally noted for the Ludlow Massacre of miners' families by the National Guard in the Southern Coal Field near Trinidad, Colorado.

Until about 1915, residents of the city were largely caucasian Midwestern transplants and Western European coal miners who'd immigrated from England, Wales and Ireland. The 1900 and 1910 census show no families with Latino surnames residing in Lafayette. Coinciding with the start of the Long Strike of 1910–1914, the coal operators began recruiting strikebreaker workers who were immigrants from Eastern Europe and Mexico. United Mine Workers Lafayette Local 1388 meeting minutes show scant traces of Latino membership from 1903 until September 1913. Initially banned from membership, union locals realized during the Long Strike of 1910–1914 the necessity of forming labor alliances with native-born and immigrant Latinos. Entering their $10 annual Lafayette Local 1388 dues at the September 25, 1913, meeting were initiates Frank Gonzales, S. Gonzales, F.H. Gallegos, A. Dominguez, Guy Dominguez, Jesus Guzman, Gabriel Vigil, Teofila Tafoya, D. Romero, Ben Martinez, Juan Guerrero and Francisco Guerrero. After the strike, Rocky Mountain Fuel Company encouraged their employees in the Southern Coal Field, largely immigrants from Mexico and second- and third-generation residents of New Mexico and Colorado, to relocate to the Lafayette area. Those Latino families located in Serene initially then moved to Lafayette after the Columbine Mine closed. In the 1920s and 1930s sugar factories in surrounding counties also recruited Latino workers to harvest sugar beets. The 1920 census showed 1,800 Lafayette residents, with 25 individuals having Latino surnames.

In 1927, Lafayette's coal miners walked off the job again, a strike nationally recognized as a great Wobbly (Industrial Workers of the World, a radical labor group) strike. The mining massacre resulted in the deaths of five Lafayette resident miners just northeast of town in the Columbine Mine massacre on November 27, 1927, in what is now the ghost town of Serene near Erie.

Another female financier came to the miners' aid. Josephine Roche, the daughter of John J. Roche, the anti-labor president of the Rocky Mountain Fuel Company (RMFC) which owned many of the mines in the Lafayette area, used some shares of the company she had inherited from her father after his death in 1927, bought a controlling interest in the company, and immediately began the most labor-friendly mine operation in the United States. She became a top assistant to Franklin D. Roosevelt's Secretary of Labor, Frances Perkins. Back in Lafayette, life became much better for the coal miners with the more labor-friendly management of the RMFC.

Coal mining declined as an industry from the 1930s through 1950s as natural gas replaced coal. The Black Diamond mine closed in 1956, and Lafayette became once more an agriculture-based community. As Denver and Boulder grew, residential growth in Lafayette increased. With the increase in residential growth, the farm-based economy changed and commercial, small industrial and manufacturing factors became more important. Lafayette's ethnic diversity continued to expand with population growth. In 1940, 76 Hispanic or Latino adults were recorded as residing in Lafayette, with a total population of 2,062. By 2016, 4,400 (18 percent) of Lafayette's 25,000 residents were Hispanic or Latino.

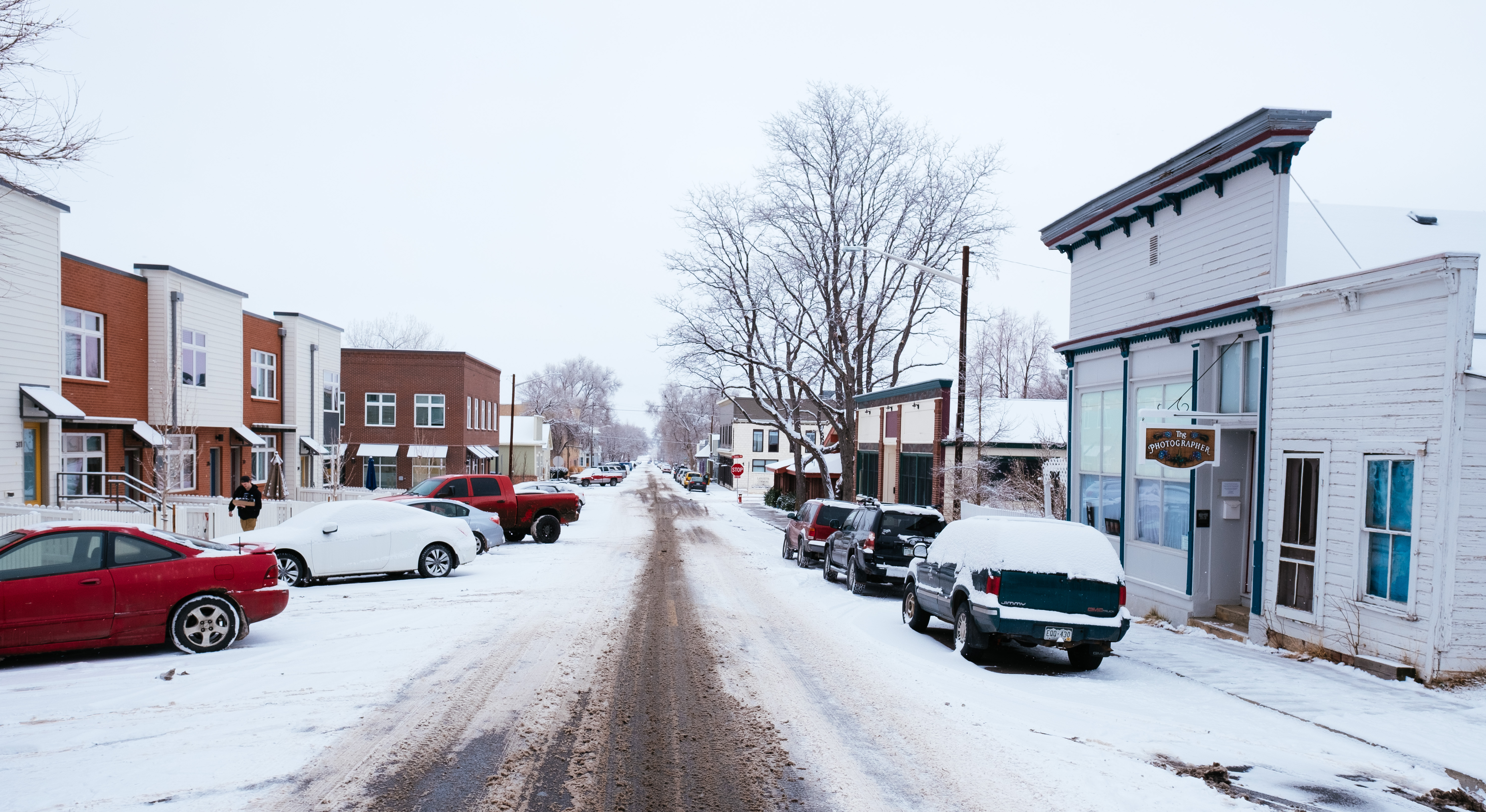
Simpson Street in Lafayette, Colorado, looking east on a snowy winter day, showing historic commercial buildings on the right and newer townhomes on the left.

=== Industry ===
Not only did coal mined in Lafayette, Louisville, Marshall and Erie heat Denver's growing number of households starting in the late 1880s, it also fueled Denver's smelters, cotton mills, breweries, paper mills, shoe factories and power plants.

In 1899, the Colorado Inspector of Coal mines estimated that the 405-square-mile Northern Coal Field contained 2.56 billion tons of coal.

Up to the turn of the 20th century, Denver customers consumed most of the coal mined in the area as fast it could be hauled up from the tunnels. Lafayette coal mines were wired for telephones starting in 1891, almost 15 years before the rest of town, because the Denver coal dealers needed a quicker way to place orders.

The first recorded evidence of coal near Lafayette was made in the summer of 1864 by General Land Office surveyor Hiram Witter, who noted in his field survey notebook for Township 1 South, Range 69 West that "In the NE 1/4 of the NE 1/4 of Sec. 1 is an outcrop of coal 1 chain long (66 feet) and 4 ft. thick, extent unknown." This is where Baseline Road crosses over Coal Creek east of Lafayette. Witter drew a line through a notation in his notebook that the "coal bank had been opened" and replaced it with "coal outcrop." The notation "had been opened" may indicate that the coal was being "worked" by settlers.

Area pioneers gathered coal from surface outcrops to use for home heating. One outcropping of coal, mentioned by Mary Miller as being discovered in 1872, was located at about the center of the Foote-Miller Farm and mined by the Cambro / Pluto slope mine from 1917 to 1928.

Mary Miller and her brother, James B. Foote, leased some of their farm land north of the Cambro / Pluto coal outcrop first to John H. Simpson, who would sink two separate Lafayette coal mines – the Simpson in late 1887 and the Spencer in 1889 – then to James Cannon Jr. in 1888. The Standard mine, about a mile east of the Spencer-Simpson mines, was also sunk in 1887.

By the early 1880s, railroads were the largest consumer of Colorado coal, and Lafayette joined the coal mining bandwagon when Colorado & Southern Railway completed a 3-mile spur from Louisville in 1889, paid for by the newly formed Spencer-Simpson Coal Company. That spur eventually connected to Erie. The railroad links to Erie, Louisville, Lafayette and Marshall coal mines nurtured the industrialization of coal mining.

The coal under Lafayette and most of the area northwest of Denver known as the Northern Coal Field or Northern Field is sub-bituminous coal, a soft, friable coal that was highly suited for household heating stoves and for firing steam boilers. Sub-bituminous coal, also called lignite, could sometimes spontaneously combust when it came in contact with air.

A significant factor in Lafayette's coal mining history were the three successive Denver-based coal conglomerates – United Coal Company, Northern Coal Co. and Rocky Mountain Fuel Company – that controlled coal production and employed thousands of local coal miners. From 1891, when United Coal was formed, to 1944, when Rocky Mountain Fuel Co. reorganized and closed most of its mines, the coal operators influenced not only how mass-scale coal was mined, marketed and sold, but how communities adjacent to the coal mines – Lafayette, Louisville, Erie, Canfield and Marshall developed.

In 1898, only 5 percent of coal mined in Lafayette was used for home heating, the rest went to Denver power plants, manufacturers and steam locomotives. From June 1, 1897, to May 31, 1898, over 680,000 tons of coal were shipped to Denver from Northern Field coal mines. In the 1920s and 1930s, Great Western Sugar in Longmont and the Valmont Generating Station in Boulder were primary coal consumers. By the mid-1940s, most of the coal mines had closed.

Most of the mines associated with the bankrupt Rocky Mountain Fuel Co., including the Columbine, were closed in 1946, after which area mines were owned and run by independent owners. Lafayette's last mine, the Black Diamond, located at today's U.S. 287 and Baseline Road, closed in 1956. The independently owned Hi-Way mine in Louisville and the Gorham in Superior closed in 1955. Erie's Eagle mine was the last coal mine to operate in the Northern Coal Field. It closed in 1975.

Very little evidence of Lafayette's coal mining past remains today. A few structures moved from the mine camps dot Old Town and the Lafayette History Museum retains some of the tools of the coal mining trade.

=== Labor ===
The extended and sometimes violent coal miner's strike of 1910–1914, called "The Long Strike," put Lafayette at the forefront of unionized labor's struggle for fair wages. Union miners belonging to United Mine Workers of America were determined to get fair wages and safety improvements in a dangerous workplace, while coal mine operators wanted the mined coal to continue flowing.

In the Northern Field, the Long Strike started April 1, 1910. United Mine Workers of America miners wanted an increase of 3 cents per ton for machine mining, 4 cents for pick mining, a 5.55 percent increase for day wages and dead work, an 8-hour work day, selection of checkweighmen, union recognition and enforcement of state labor and mine safety laws.

At a convention in Trinidad in September 1913, United Mine Workers delegates from across the state endorsed a statewide strike, which became the greatest labor upheaval in Colorado history. Coal miners statewide accused operators of favoring profits over the safety of workers, and their demands included coal operators’ recognition of the union, an increase in wages of 10 percent, an eight-hour workday for all classes of labor in or around the coal mines, payment for deadwork, the right to have union-paid weigh bosses, the right of the miners to trade wherever they pleased (instead of company stores), the right to choose their own boarding place and their own doctor, the enforcement of the Colorado mining laws and "total abolition of the notorious and criminal guard system."

During the strike, Rocky Mountain Fuel Co., owners of the Simpson and Vulcan mines in Lafayette, the Acme mine in Louisville and the Industrial mine in Superior, recruited and paid the railroad fare for nonunion coal miners from W. Virginia, Tennessee, Kentucky and Joplin, Missouri. Strikebreakers were labeled either "scabs" or "blacklegs."

Those on strike, members of United Mine Workers, were called "rednecks" because they wore red handkerchiefs around their necks. After asking Boulder County Sheriff M.P. Capp to deputize up to 75 company men to help guard the mines, which he refused, Northern Coal and Coke Co. hired West Virginia-based Baldwin-Felts Detective Agency guards to protect the company's assets. The Baldwin-Felts guards, known in southern coal states for protecting coal trains and payroll shipments, were hired to prevent trespassing on company property.

In September 1910 coal operators, including RM Fuel's E.E. Shumway, asked Denver District Court Judge Greeley W. Whitford to issue an injunction to restrain striking miners from gathering in groups, posting notices or interfering with nonunion operation of the mines. Whitford agreed to the injunction and appointed Baldwin-Felts detectives as enforcers.

Elected in November 1912, Colorado Governor Elias M. Ammons sent the Colorado militia to Boulder County to quell the strike violence after a September 17, 1913, gun battle raged on the east side of Lafayette. Union sympathizers said that nonunion employees at the Simpson mine, "the Bulgarians," fired indiscriminately at union members returning from work at an adjacent union mine. The nonunion workers claim that union sympathizers started the fight by throwing rocks through one of the company buildings in the Simpson compound.

All sides agreed that numerous volleys of gunshots, estimated at over 1,000 rounds, originated in both the stockade – shooting toward downtown Lafayette – and in downtown Lafayette shooting toward the stockade. One person inside the stockade was injured by a gunshot, and one horse was killed.

After U.S. troops brought in to referee the strike encamped near the Lafayette cemetery on October 28, 1913, they proceeded to confiscate all guns in Lafayette, even searching homes room-by-room. The following week, children of union men refused to go to school with two boys whose fathers had scabbed the previous summer.

The Long Strike was called off by the UMWA in late 1914. The large Colorado coal operators who'd refused all of the miners’ demands, Rocky Mountain Fuel Co. and Colorado Fuel and Iron, agreed only to rehire the miners that went on strike. The general consensus was that the UMWA's 1913–1914 statewide strike didn't accomplish much, and it was decades before the union regained its influence in Colorado.

Edward Lawrence Doyle (1886–1954), Lafayette resident from 1908 to 1912 and UMWA Dist. 15 secretary-treasurer based in Denver from 1912 to 1917, is better known for his involvement in the fateful 1914 Ludlow Massacre, where he played a key role in communicating to national media the union's perspective of the killings. As part of that job, he corresponded regularly with labor activist Mother Jones and with author Upton Sinclair, who wrote "King Coal," an exposé on the dangerous conditions Colorado coal miners faced. Doyle was entrusted by Sinclair to proofread "King Coal" for accuracy prior to its release in 1917.

In 1909, Doyle worked as a checkweighman at the Capitol mine east of Lafayette where he advocated for miners’ safety, including dogging the mine's owner to remove snow and ice that regularly blocked the mine's escape shaft after snow storms. Doyle worked his way into leadership of Lafayette Local 1388 during the first few years of the Long Strike, where he organized the group's civil disobedience efforts. Doyle aggressively rooted out turncoat union members hired by coal operators to spy on the organization. He also planted two of his own union men, hired from out-of-state, who posed as scabs in each local coal mine.

== Transportation ==
Between 1849 and 1870, California goldseekers – followed by the grand Concord Coaches of the Overland Express and Mail Co. — traveled the Cherokee Trail, an ancient north–south trading route overlapped today by U.S. Highway 287 in Lafayette. From 1864 to 1868, the Cherokee Trail/Laramie Road was a principal travel corridor to the west and a key part of the Overland Mail and Express Co.’s 1,000-mile route, which originated in Atchison, Kansas. The Front Range portion of the Southern Route went north from Denver to LaPorte and Virginia Dale where the trail rejoined the Central Overland Route in Laramie, Wyoming.

The Overland Mail and Express Co.'s 600-mile Denver to Salt Lake City Division was composed of 46 stage stations spaced every 10 to 15 miles. The stagecoach crossing at Boulder Creek north of Lafayette was at today's N. 109th Street near Brownsville, about 1/2-mile east of U.S. Highway 287. Starting in 1864, three Overland Stage Line stations in Boulder and Broomfield counties operated under the purview of Ben Holladay's Overland Mail and Express Co.: Little Thompson stage station about 2 miles north of today's Longmont, Boon's Ranch (Boulder Station) stage station at Boulder Creek, and Church's Ranch stage station (then called Child's stage station) located near today's Old Wadsworth and 105th Street in Westminster. The Burlington House in what is now Longmont became an Overland Stage Line home station a few years later.

From 1866 to 1871, Lafayette and Mary Miller operated the Miller Tavern Ranch, a saloon and stage stop for the Mason & Ganow stagecoach at the former Stearns Dairy north of Dillon Road on U.S. 287, today known as the Rock Creek Farm.

The Mason & Ganow stagecoach company launched on October 17, 1868, to compete with Wells Fargo and promoted daily overnight service from Denver to Cheyenne, about 100 miles. Heading north, the stagecoach left Denver at 8 a.m. and arrived in Cheyenne at 7 a.m. the next morning. Traveling south, the stagecoach left Cheyenne at 6 p.m.

Lafayette pioneers Adolf and Anna Waneka ran the two-story stage stop on Coal Creek located where today's U.S. 287 crosses Coal Creek in Lafayette but it, too, was a meal stop and not a swing station.

The Rocky Mountain News for November 19, 1867, listed six stage companies operating from Denver: Wells, Fargo & Company with stages leaving daily for points east via the Platte and points west via Salt Lake City; Denver, Valmont and Boulder stage company leaving Thursdays and Saturdays; United States Express Company leaving daily for points east via Smoky Hill route; Hariman & Harmon's stage leaving for South Park each Thursday; Denver, Idaho and Georgetown Express leaving Denver Tuesdays, Thursdays and Saturdays; the Denver and Santa Fe Stage Line, leaving Denver for points south every Monday, Wednesday and Friday.

Ben Holladay's Overland Mail and Express Co. was sold to Wells, Fargo & Company in 1866 for $1.8 million in cash and stocks. After the Transcontinental Railroad was completed to Cheyenne in 1867, stagecoach travel declined, and the majority of stagecoaches heading from Denver to Cheyenne carried passengers looking to catch an eastbound train.

By early 1869, Wells Fargo had sold all of its stagecoach operations, including the Denver to Cheyenne run, which was acquired by John Hughes. Robert Spotswood and William McClelland bought the stage line from Hughes and continued running the Denver to Cheyenne stage until November 27, 1869.

== Recreation ==
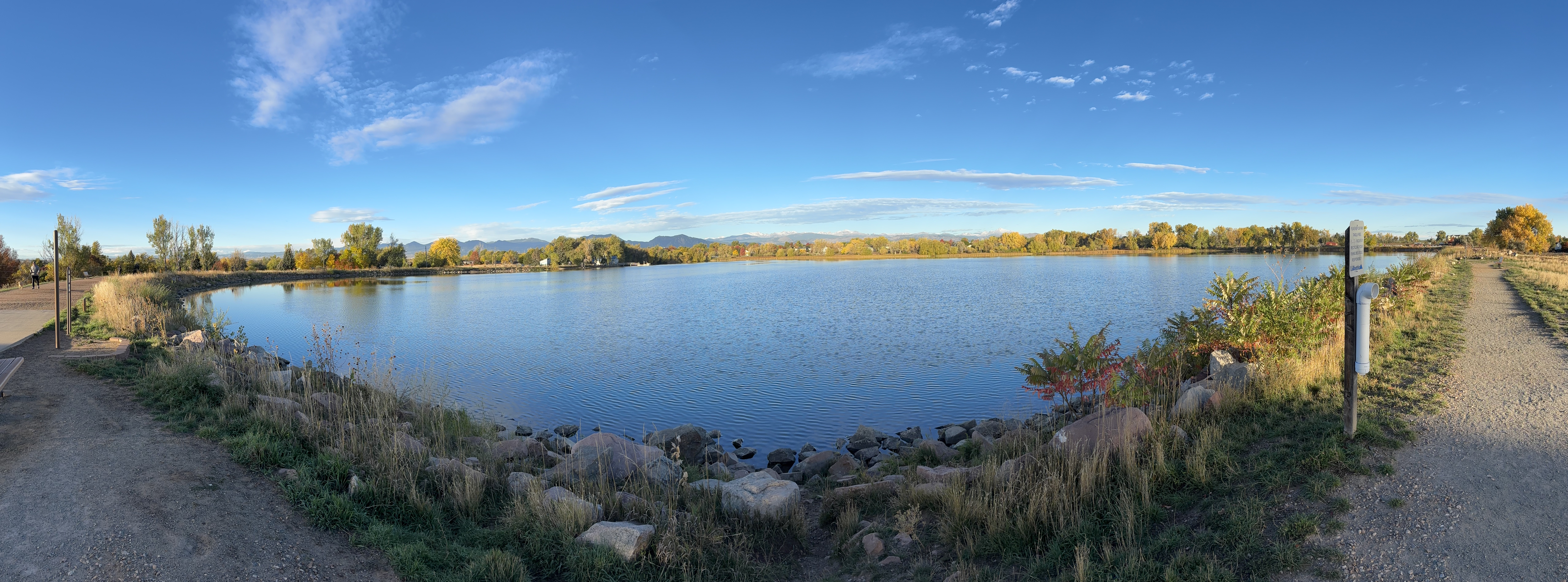
Panoramic view across Waneka Lake from the east shore trail in Lafayette, Colorado, showing autumn foliage and the distant Front Range.

Lafayette's most popular recreation destination is the city-owned Waneka Lake, a man-made reservoir situated in Waneka Lake Park at West Emma Street and Caria Drive.

Waneka Lake Park is a recreational and wildlife refuge in a suburban setting. Waneka Lake Park features playground structures, shelter facilities, picnic tables, benches, fishing areas, and a 1.2 mile fitness trail for walking, biking or running within its 147 acres.

The southeast corner of Waneka Lake Park features Lafayette's oldest structure, the Waneka Granary, built in the 1870s. The late Charles "Clancy" Waneka believed that Lafayette pioneer Adolf Waneka built it, while Clancy's cousin, Charles "Chuck" Waneka has always argued that the pioneer Harmon Family built it. The structure provides an excellent window into early construction methods including hand hewn logs and square iron nails.

Colorado Div. of Water Resources records (Dam ID = 060225) indicate that the lake was built by Adolf Waneka in 1865 to hold water coming out of a nearby spring. This was corroborated by Clancy Waneka, who in 1989 told the Lafayette News that "Sometime in the 1860s (Adolf Waneka) scooped out a small reservoir that held about 13-acre-feet and this was recorded and is a matter of record in the State Engineer's office." Adolf gave his interest in the lake to his son, Henry "Boye" Waneka, who then sold to William, Frank and Guy Harmon in 1897. Northern Colorado Power Company documents from 1906 and reservoir records at the Colorado Div. of Water Resources both show that the original name of Waneka Lake was "Henry Waneka No. 1 Reservoir." Northern Power expanded the lake, which was later called Plant Lake, in 1906 to store 28 million cu. ft. (790,000 m^{3}) of water for its steam generators. Mary Miller and the power company split 50/50 the rights to the additional water stored. When town founder Mary Miller owned the lake, it was known as the Millar and Harmon Reservoir.

Northern Colorado Power Company constructed a 6,000 kilowatt Northern Colorado and Interurban Power Plant on the south edge of Plant lake in 1905–06. It supplied alternating current to the electric-powered Interurban passenger trolley service that connected Boulder to Denver. Joseph J. Henry of Denver developed the power plant business plan and directors included W.F. Crossley, Tyson Dines, W.H. Allison, Sen. F.E. Warren (from Wyoming), William J. Barker, Thomas Kelly, Robert S. Ellison, William Mayer and C.C. Bromley.

Blue Ribbon Hill east of Lafayette was initially thought to be the best place for the new Northern Colorado electric plant, due to the presence of Coal Creek water. The power plant was instead located at what is now Waneka Lake. Boulder County Clerk records show that Mary Miller bought the reservoir in 1904 from William, Frank and Guy Harmon, but the Harmons retained rights to some of the water flowing into Miller and Harmon Reservoir. The power plant was last used in the 1920s and was torn down in 1963.

Boulder County Clerk and Recorder records show that the City of Lafayette bought "Henry Waneka Reservoir" from J.B. Telleen in October 1972. Several years later, the State of Colorado deemed the reservoir unsafe, but the City of Lafayette made repairs and brought the reservoir up to muster.

== Government ==
The Lafayette City Council serves as the community's legislative body, enacting ordinances, appropriating funds to conduct city business, and providing policy direction for city governance through the city administrator. The council consists of seven members who are elected on a non-partisan basis in odd-numbered years. Terms are staggered as four seats must be filled each election year. The three councilors with the most votes serve four-year terms and the fourth receives a two-year term. The mayor and mayor pro-tem are selected by the City Council for two-year terms. As of December 2021, the current mayor of Lafayette is JD Mangat and the mayor pro-tem is Brian Wong. In November 2025, Lafayette established its first sister city partnership with Iquitos in Peru's Loreto Region, following unanimous City Council approval on August 5 and Iquitos' approval in early November, with a formal signing ceremony held at City Hall on December 1 facilitated by the nonprofit One Voice 4 Change.

Notable political vacancies in Lafayette's history:

- Died in office: Lafayette Miller, 1878, town of Boulder trustee; died while in office.
- Removals: Richard W. Morgan, 1907, Colorado state senator; removed from office for accepting $700 bribe.
- City council resignations: Walter Moon, 1891 (an alderman); Joe Mathias, 1935; Roy "Ham" Roberts, 1959; Tom Lopez, 1975; Carl Williams, 1980; John Drennen, 1986; Candy Fox, 1996; Bryan Olson, 1996; Mike Romero, 1999; Dennis Buck, 2000; Mark Hoskins, 2001; Tom Anderson, 2001; Andy Proctor, 2002; Dave Schneller, 2003; Tom Hogue, 2003; Alex Schatz, 2005; Kerry Bensman, 2010; Chris Cameron, 2010; Tom Dowling, 2016; Gustavo Reyna, 2018; Christine Berg, 2019; Merrily Mazza, 2019.

=== Sister cities ===
Lafayette has one sister city:

- Iquitos, Loreto Region, Peru – first Sister City partnership for both municipalities (since 2025).

== Events ==
Lafayette has a variety of events each year, including a peach festival, wine festival, and Lafayette Days. For many years, until 2024, an oatmeal festival in cooperation with the Quaker Oats Company was held with a fitness run around Waneka Lake. Festival Plaza is a gathering place in Old Town Lafayette on Public Road and Chester Street. The Plaza is composed of a series of four smaller interconnected plazas, each designed with features to promote various events.

== Education ==
Lafayette public schools are part of the Boulder Valley School District. The main public high school in Lafayette is Centaurus High School, which has approximately 1,600 students. Peak to Peak Charter School offers kindergarten through high school. The public middle school is Angevine Middle School, which feeds into Centaurus. The elementary schools are Lafayette, Alicia Sanchez, Bernard D. 'Pat' Ryan STEAM school, and Pioneer Elementary, a bilingual school where English and Spanish are both spoken. Alexander Dawson School is a private K-12 college prep school in the north part of town.

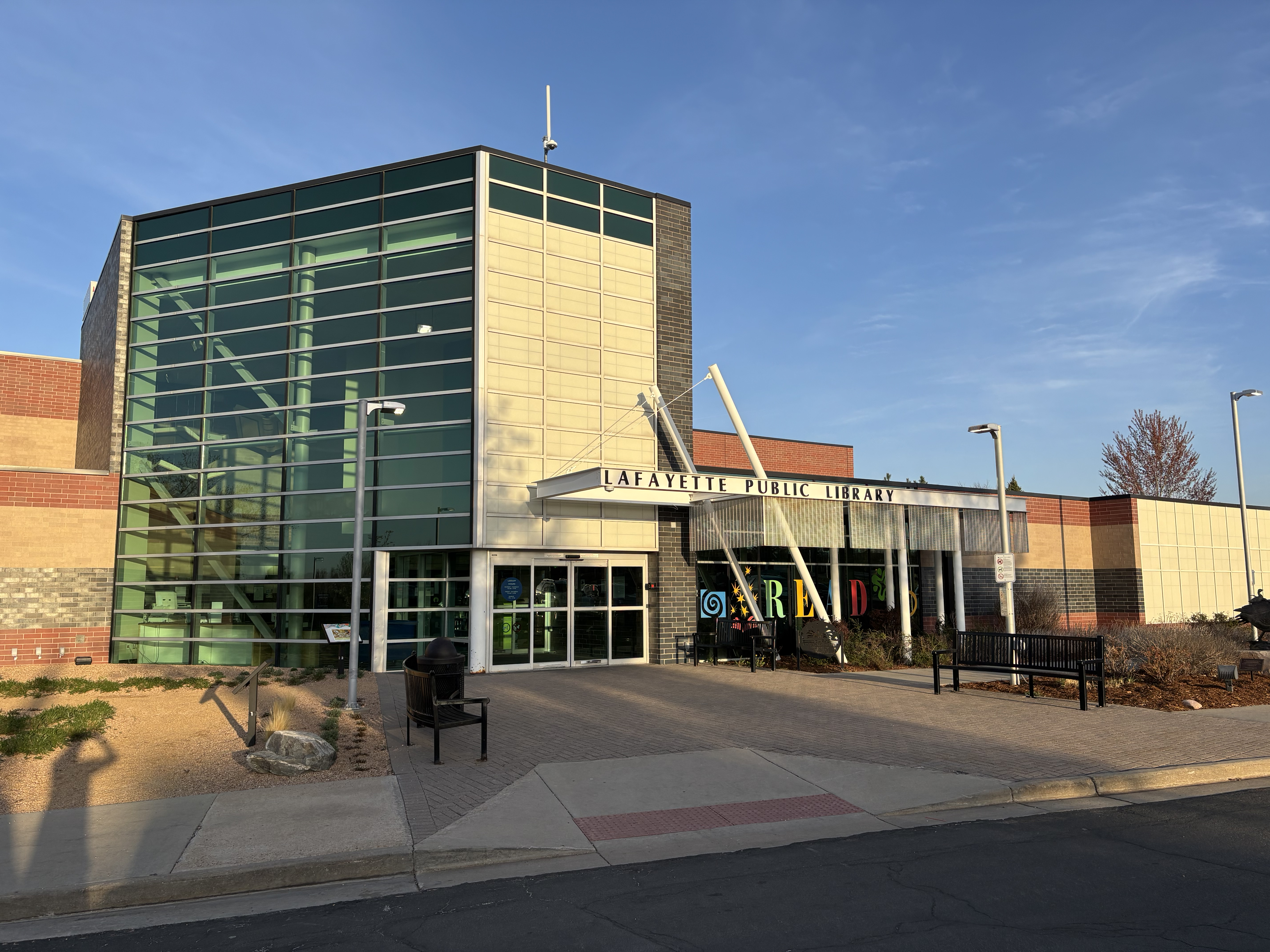
Main entrance (west facing) of the Lafayette Public Library.

== Demographics ==
Historical population
Census	Pop.	Note	%±
1890	410		—
1900	970		136.6%
1910	1,892		95.1%
1920	1,815		−4.1%
1930	1,842		1.5%
1940	2,052		11.4%
1950	2,090		1.9%
1960	2,612		25.0%
1970	3,498		33.9%
1980	8,985		156.9%
1990	14,548		61.9%
2000	23,197		59.5%
2010	24,453		5.4%
2020	30,411		24.4%
2024 (est.)	30,587	▲	0.6%
U.S. Decennial Census

=== 2020 census ===
As of the 2020 census, Lafayette had a population of 30,411. The median age was 38.9 years. 22.9% of residents were under the age of 18 and 14.3% of residents were 65 years of age or older. For every 100 females there were 96.3 males, and for every 100 females age 18 and over there were 92.2 males age 18 and over.

99.9% of residents lived in urban areas, while 0.1% lived in rural areas.

There were 12,070 households in Lafayette, of which 33.1% had children under the age of 18 living in them. Of all households, 48.5% were married-couple households, 16.8% were households with a male householder and no spouse or partner present, and 26.7% were households with a female householder and no spouse or partner present. About 25.2% of all households were made up of individuals and 9.3% had someone living alone who was 65 years of age or older.

There were 12,456 housing units, of which 3.1% were vacant. The homeowner vacancy rate was 0.4% and the rental vacancy rate was 3.8%.

Racial composition as of the 2020 census
Race	Number	Percent
White	22,789	74.9%
Black or African American	345	1.1%
American Indian and Alaska Native	278	0.9%
Asian	1,278	4.2%
Native Hawaiian and Other Pacific Islander	18	0.1%
Some other race	2,041	6.7%
Two or more races	3,662	12.0%
Hispanic or Latino (of any race)	5,614	18.5%

=== 2010 census ===
As of the census of 2010, there were 24,453 people, 9,632 households, and 6,354 families residing in the city. The population density was 2,584 inhabitants per square mile (998/km^{2}). There were 9,997 housing units at an average density of 1,052.3 units per square mile (406.3 units/km^{2}). The racial makeup of the city was 85.6% White, 1.1% African American, 0.9% Native American, 3.8% Asian, 0.05% Pacific Islander, 5.4% some other race, and 3.2% from two or more races. Hispanic or Latino people of any race were 18.2% of the population.

There were 9,632 households, of which 36.5% had children under the age of 18 living in them; 49.9% were headed by married couples living together; 11.6% had a female householder with no husband present; and 34.0% were non-families. Of all households, 25.5% were made up of individuals, and 5.9% were someone living alone who was 65 years of age or older. Average household size was 2.54, and average family size was 3.08.

In the city, the population was spread out, with 25.4% under the age of 18, 6.9% from 18 to 24, 29.7% from 25 to 44, 29.9% from 45 to 64, and 8.1% who were 65 years of age or older. The median age was 37.6 years. For every 100 females, there were 95.8 males. For every 100 females age 18 and over, there were 91.9 males.

=== 2009–2011 American Community Survey ===
For the period 2009–2011, the estimated median income for a household in the city in 2010 was $66,202, and the median income for a family was $79,212. Male full-time workers had a median income of $54,313 versus $50,166 for females. The per capita income for the city was $34,711. About 9.3% of families and 12.5% of the population were below the poverty line.

== Religion ==
Lafayette's first established church was the Congregational Church, which was established in 1890 by John and Annie Jones, Mr. and Mrs. J. M. Van Deren and Laura Kimbark. Lafayette town founder Mary E. Miller paid for the construction of the church circa 1892 and funded the salary of the church's first pastor. In 1907, the Catholic Church of St. Ida was established. This was replaced in 1954 by the Immaculate Conception Catholic Church. Flatirons Community Church was founded in Lafayette in 1997.

== Notable people ==
- Bob Beauprez (born 1948), Republican politician
- Devon Beitzel (born 1988), former professional basketball point guard
- John C. Buechner (1934–2018), educator, politician and City Councillor
- Edward Doyle (Labor Activist) (1886-1954), coal miner and union activist
- Lars Grimsrud, retired aerospace engineer and performance automobile enthusiast
- Maria Handley (born 1977), member-at-large of the Democratic National Committee
- Lafayette vampire (1877-1918), also known as Teodor Glava
- Steven Lindsey (born 1960), retired U.S. Air Force officer and NASA astronaut
- James Lord (unionist) (1878-1962), coal miner and union activist
- John Massaro (1959-2022), also known as John Vincent Hazlett, guitarist and wrote songs for Steve Miller Band
- Lenny Metz (1899–1953), shortstop for the Philadelphia Phillies 1923–25, lived in Lafayette
- Mary E. Miller (1843–1921) founded the town of Lafayette, Colorado
- Joe Neguse (born 1984), US Representative for Colorado's 2nd District
- Alicia Sanchez (1926–1985), Latina activist who founded the Clinica Campesina
- Marilyn Sitzman (1939–1993), receptionist and witness to the assassination of JFK
- Jessica Watkins (born 1988), geologist, former international rugby player and 2017 NASA astronaut candidate

== See also ==
- Boulder, CO Metropolitan Statistical Area
- Northwest Parkway
