= List of megachurches in the United States =

This is a list of the largest megachurches in the United States with a weekly attendance of more than 10,000, sometimes also termed a gigachurch. According to The Hartford Institute's database, approximately 50 churches had attendance ranging from 10,000 to 47,000 in 2010. The Harford Institute for Religion Research estimates that there are approximately 1,800 such Protestant megachurches in the United States.

As the term megachurch in common parlance refers to Protestant congregations; although there are some Catholic parishes which would meet the criteria, they are not listed. St Ann's in Coppell, Texas, would be near the top, with almost 30,000 registered parishioners in 2013. St. Matthew Catholic Church in the Ballantyne neighborhood of Charlotte, North Carolina likewise has been described as a Catholic megachurch with nearly 36,000 registered members in 2017 and 11 weekly masses. Weekly attendance figures may be lower than the number of registered parishioners, and the differences in the way the churches operate and the way attendance is counted are given as reasons for not including Catholic churches in lists of megachurches.

Membership numbers of the following churches give only a very rough indication of size. They vary from year to year. Also, some churches report typical Sunday attendance while others report the number who are listed in church records or make financial contributions, which may be higher. Some of the larger churches are multi-site churches. Many churches deliver their message through television or other media, sometimes reaching much higher numbers than those who physically attend the church.

== List ==
Note that the attendance numbers are often provided by the church itself.

Church	City (Note: The "City" column indicates where each listed church has its main location.)	State	Senior pastor(s)	Avg. weekly attendance (Note: Numbers are rounded to the nearest hundred.)	Association	Number of sites	Other media
Abundant Church	El Paso	TX	Charles Nieman	12,400	Non-denominational		
Ada Bible Church	Ada	MI	Aaron Buer	8,600	Non-denominational	6	Online
Athey Creek Church	West Linn	OR	Brett Meador	8,000	Non-denominational	3	Online
Bayside Community Church	Bradenton	FL	Randy and Amy Bezet	12,000	Non-denominational	8	
Calvary Chapel Fort Lauderdale	Fort Lauderdale	FL	Doug Sauder	16,000	Calvary Chapel	9	Online
Calvary Chapel Golden Springs	Diamond Bar	CA	Raul Ries	12,000	Calvary Chapel		
Calvary Chapel Melbourne	West Melbourne	FL	Dave Folkerts	10,000	Calvary Chapel	3	Online
Calvary Chapel of Philadelphia	Philadelphia	PA	Joe Focht	12,000	Calvary Chapel		
Calvary of Albuquerque	Albuquerque	NM	Skip Heitzig	16,200	Calvary Chapel		
Calvary Community Church	Phoenix	AZ	J. Mark Martin	4,000	Calvary Chapel	2	Online
Campus Church	Pensacola	FL	Jeff Redlin	5,200	Baptist	1	
Celebration Church	Jacksonville	FL	Tim Timberlake	11,100	Non-denominational	9	Online
Central Church	Henderson	NV	Jud Wilhite	21,100	Christian churches and churches of Christ	9	Online
Christ Fellowship	Palm Beach Gardens	FL	Todd & Julie Mullins	25,000	Non-denominational	17	Online
Christ's Church of the Valley	Peoria	AZ	Ashley Wooldridge	56,216	Non-denominational	18	Online
Christian Cultural Center	New York	NY	A. R. Bernard	32,000	Non-denominational	1	Online
Church of Eleven22	Jacksonville	FL	Joby P. Martin	19,200	Non-denominational	6	
Church of the Highlands	Birmingham	AL	Mark Pettus	60,000	Non-denominational	27	Online
Church on the Move	Tulsa	OK	Whit & Heather George	11,000			
Church Unlimited	Corpus Christi	TX	Bil Cornelius	12,000	Non-Denominational	9	
City of Refuge	Gardena	CA	Noel Jones	10,000	Pentecostal Assemblies of the World		
Community Bible Church	San Antonio	TX	Ed Newton	12,000	Non-denominational	At least 2	Online
Cross Church	Springdale	AR	Nick Floyd	16,000	Southern Baptist Convention	5	
Crossings Community Church	Oklahoma City	OK	Marty Grubbs	10,000	Church of God (Anderson, Indiana)	4	Online
Crossroads Church – Cincinnati	Cincinnati	OH	Brian Tome	35,000	Interdenominational	13	Online
Deliverance Evangelistic Church	Philadelphia	PA	Glen Spaulding	11,000	Non-denominational		
Dream City Church	Phoenix	AZ	Tommy Barnett, Luke Barnett	20,000	Assemblies of God	5	
Eagle Brook Church	Lino Lakes	MN	Jason Strand	43,871	Baptist	11	Online
Ebenezer AME Church	Fort Washington	MD	Grainger Browning, Jr.	10,000	African Methodist Episcopal Church		
Ebenezer Baptist Church	Atlanta	GA	Raphael Warnock	6,000	Progressive National Baptist Convention and American Baptist Churches USA		
El Rey Jesús (King Jesus International Ministry)	Miami	FL	Guillermo Maldonado	12,500	Non-denominational/Pentecostal		
Elevation Church	Charlotte	NC	Steven Furtick	26,000	Non-denominational	21	
Empowerment Temple	Baltimore	MD	Pastor GJ Barnes	10,000	African Methodist Episcopal Church		
Enon Tabernacle Baptist Church	Philadelphia	PA	Alyn E. Waller	15,000	Baptist	>1	
EPIC Church International	Sayreville	NJ	John J. Wagner	10,100	Non-denominational		
Every Nation Churches	Brentwood	TN	Steve Murrell	37,000 (US only)	Non-denominational	116 locations across the United States, 611 internationally	
Faith Landmarks Ministries	Richmond	VA	Randy Gilbert	10,000			
Faith Promise Church	Knoxville	TN	Zac Stephens	10,000	Non-demoninational		Online
Family Christian Center	Munster	IN	Steve Munsey	14,000	Non-denominational		
Fellowship Church	Grapevine	TX	Ed Young, Jr.	24,200	Southern Baptist Convention	9	Online
First African Methodist Episcopal Church	Los Angeles	CA	J. Edgar Boyd	10,000	African Methodist Episcopal Church		
First Baptist Church of Glenarden	Upper Marlboro	MD	Pastor John K. Jenkins	12,000	Converge (United States)	2	Online
First Baptist Church of Hammond	Hammond	IN	John Wilkerson	10,000	Baptist		
First Baptist Church Orlando	Orlando	FL	David Uth	16,000	Southern Baptist Convention		
Flatirons Community Church	Lafayette	CO	Jim Burgen	15,495	Non-denominational evangelical	6	Online
Fountain of Praise	Houston	TX	Remus Wright	11,800			
Free Chapel	Gainesville	GA	Jentezen Franklin	25,000	Non-denominational	7	Online, TV
Franklin Avenue Baptist Church	New Orleans	LA	Fred Luter	6,000	Southern Baptist Convention		
Friendship-West Baptist Church	Dallas	TX	Frederick Haynes III	12,000	Progressive National Baptist Convention		
Gateway Church	Southlake	TX	Daniel Floyd	25,800	Non-denominational Charismatic	10	Online, Prison campuses
Germantown Baptist Church	Germantown	TN	Tommy Vinson, Interim Preacher	12,000	Southern Baptist Convention		
Greater Allen A. M. E. Cathedral of New York	New York	NY	Floyd Flake	20,000	African Methodist Episcopal Church		
Greater St. Stephen Full Gospel Baptist	New Orleans	LA	Paul Morton	10,000	Full Gospel Baptist Church Fellowship		
Green Acres Baptist Church	Tyler	TX	David Dykes	14,000	Southern Baptist Convention	>1	
Harvest Christian Fellowship	Riverside	CA	Greg Laurie	15,000	Calvary Chapel	6	
Healing Place Church	Baton Rouge	LA	Mike Haman	12,000	Non-denominational	13	
Hickory Grove Baptist Church	Charlotte	NC	Clint Pressley	11,900	Southern Baptist Convention	3	
Hope City Church	Houston	TX	Daniel and Jackie Groves	12,000	Non-denominational	4	
Hope Community Church	Raleigh	NC	Jason Gore	15,000	Non-denominational	4	
Inspiring Body of Christ Church (IBOC)	Dallas	TX	Rickie Rush	15,000	Non-denominational	1	Online
James River Church	Springfield	MO	John Lindell	17,000	Assemblies of God	4	Online
Kensington Church	Troy	MI	Brian Mowrey	11,000	Non-denominational	7	
King's Cathedral and Chapels	Kahului	HI	James Marocco & Colleen Marocco	30,000	Assemblies of God	360	
Lakepointe Church	Rockwall	TX	Josh Howerton	20,000	Southern Baptist Convention	6	Online
Lakewood Church	Houston	TX	Joel Osteen	45,000	Non-denominational		
Legacy Church	Albuquerque	NM	Steve Smotherman	10,100	Non-denominational		
LibertyLive.church	Hampton	VA	Dr. Grant Ethridge	10,000	Southern Baptist Convention	7	Online
LCBC	Manheim	PA	Jason Mitchell	19,000	Non-denominational	19	Online
Life.Church	Edmond	OK	Craig Groeschel	85,000	Evangelical Covenant Church (ECC)	42	Online
Living Word Christian Center	Chicago	IL	Bill Winston	18,000	Non-denominational		
Lutheran Church of Hope	West Des Moines	IA	Mike Housholder	10,000	Lutheran Congregations in Mission for Christ		
Mariners Church	Irvine	CA	Eric Geiger	12,200	Non-denominational Evangelical	5 (Note: Including 2 campus plants.)	Online
Mars Hill Bible Church	Grandville	MI	Ashlee Eiland and Troy Hatfield	12,000	Non-denominational		
McLean Bible Church	McLean	VA	David Platt	16,500	Non-denominational		
Milestone Church	Keller	TX	Jeff Little	8,000	Non-denominational	4	Online
Mt. Ennon Baptist Church	Clinton, Maryland	MD	Delman Coates	8,000	National Baptist Convention, USA		
Mount Zion Baptist Church	Nashville	TN	Joseph W. Walker III	21,000	Full Gospel Baptist Church Fellowship		
New Birth Missionary Baptist Church	Stonecrest	GA	Jamal H. Bryant	10,000	Baptist		
New Hope Christian Fellowship	Honolulu	HI	Wayne Cordeiro	14,500	Foursquare Church	>100	Online
New Life Church	Conway	AR	Rick & Michelle Bezet	18,000	Non-denominational	17	
New Life Church	Colorado Springs	CO	Daniel Grothe	15,000 at main campus	Non-denominational	8	Online; TV
New Life Covenant Church	Chicago	IL	John F. Hannah	10,000	Non-denominational	3	
New Light Christian Center Church	Houston	TX	Ira V. Hilliard	13,500	Non-denominational		
NewSpring Church	Anderson	SC	Brad Cooper, Shane Duffey, Michael Mulliken, Tyler Tatum, David Hall	20,500	Baptist	20	Online
North Coast Church	Vista	CA	Larry Osborne, Chris Brown	10,000	Evangelical Free Church of America	5	
North Point Community Church	Alpharetta	GA	Andy Stanley	50,000	Non-denominational	8 (in Atlanta) >150 partner churches (globally)	
One Community Church	Plano	TX	Conway Edwards	10,000	Non-denominational	4	Online
Pinelake Church	Flowood	MS	Chip Henderson	11,472	Southern Baptist Convention	5	Online
Potential Church	Fort Lauderdale	FL	Troy Gramling	12,000	Southern Baptist Convention	7	
The Potter's House	Dallas	TX	T. D. Jakes	16,140	Non-denominational	3	
Prestonwood Baptist Church	Plano	TX	Jack Graham	17,000	Southern Baptist Convention	2 (Note: Prestonwood also operates two Spanish congregations, one at its main campus in Plano and the other at its Prosper campus.)	Online
Redemption Church	San Jose	CA	Ron Carpenter	11,000			
Relentless Church	Greenville	SC	John Gray	14,000	International Pentecostal Holiness Church		
River Church	Anaheim	CA	Dante Gebel	10,000	Assemblies of God		
The Rock Church & World Outreach Center	San Bernardino	CA	Dan Roth	14,550	Non-denominational		
Rock Church	San Diego	CA	Miles McPherson	12,900	Non-denominational	4	Online
Saddleback Church	Lake Forest	CA	Andy Wood	28,000	Baptist	14 + 4 international	Online
Sagebrush Church	Albuquerque	NM	Todd Cook	14,000	Non-denominational	9	Online
Sagemont Church	Houston	TX	Dr. Levi Skipper	17,700	Southern Baptist Convention		
Scottsdale Bible Church	Scottsdale	AZ	Rustin Rossello	10,000	Non-Denominational	3	Online
St. Matthews Baptist Church	Williamstown	NJ	Raymond Gordon Sr.	13,000	Baptist		
Salem Baptist Church	Chicago	IL	James Meeks	17,000 members.	Baptist		
Sandals Church	Riverside	CA	Matt Brown	15,000	Southern Baptist Convention	8	
Sarang Community Church of Southern California	Anaheim	CA	Chang Soo Ro	11,000	Presbyterian Church in America		
Seacoast Church	Mount Pleasant	SC	Josh Surratt	14,000	Non-denominational	13	Online
Second Baptist Church Houston	Houston	TX	Ben Young	23,700	Southern Baptist Convention	6	Online
Southeast Christian Church	Middletown (Note: Although Southeast Christian has a Louisville mailing address, its main worship complex is within the city limits of Middletown. The governments of Louisville and surrounding Jefferson County merged in 2003, but Middletown and the 82 other cities (apart from Louisville) in Jefferson County retained separate city limits and some governmental powers.)	KY	Kyle Idleman	25,940	Christian churches and churches of Christ	11 + 1 in development	Online
Southland Christian Church	Nicholasville (Note: Although Southland Christian is historically associated with Lexington, it moved to an unincorporated area of Jessamine County, about a half-mile (800 m) from the Lexington boundary, in 1981. The church long maintained a Lexington mailing address, but now has a Nicholasville mailing address. Southland opened a new satellite campus in Lexington in 2013.)	KY	Jon Weece	12,500	Christian churches and churches of Christ	5	Online
Substance Church	Minneapolis	MN	Peter and Carolyn Haas	12,000	Non-Denominational (ARC)		
Thomas Road Baptist Church	Lynchburg	VA	Jonathan Falwell	24,000	Southern Baptist Convention, Baptist Bible Fellowship International		
Triumph Church	Detroit	MI	Solomon W. Kinloch, Jr	14,000	Non-denominational	4	
12Stone Church	Lawrenceville	GA	Jason Berry	17,200	Wesleyan Church	8	Online
Valley Bible Fellowship	Bakersfield	CA	Ron Vietti	10,300			
Victory Church	Norcross	GA	Johnson and Summer Bowie	10,200	Non-denominational	4	Online
The Well	Sandy	UT	Jason and Erica Parrish	5,000	Non-denominational	1	Online
West Angeles Cathedral	Los Angeles	CA	Charles E. Blake	24,000	Church of God in Christ		
Willow Creek Community Church	South Barrington	IL	Dave Dummitt	18,000	Non-denominational	7	
Woodlands Church	The Woodlands	TX	Kerry Shook	18,400	Southern Baptist Convention		
Woodside Bible Church	Troy	MI	Chris Brooks	10,500	Baptist heritage	14	
World Changers Church Int.	College Park	GA	Creflo and Taffi Dollar	15,000	Pentecostal, Word of Faith		
World Overcomers Christian Church	Durham	NC	Andy Thompson	15,000	Non-denominational	4	
World Harvest Church	Columbus	OH	Rod Parsley	13,000	Pentecostal		
World Outreach Church	Murfreesboro	TN	Allen Jackson	15,000	Non-denominational		

== See also ==
- List of the largest evangelical megachurches
- List of the largest evangelical church auditoriums
- List of largest church buildings in the world
