= Segadores de Vida =

Church in Florida, United States

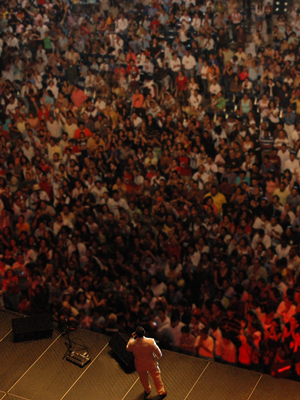
- Segadores de Vida
- 26.05981°N 80.42679°W
- Country: United States
- Denomination: Non-denominational Christianity
- Website: http://www.segadores.com/

History
- Founded: 1992
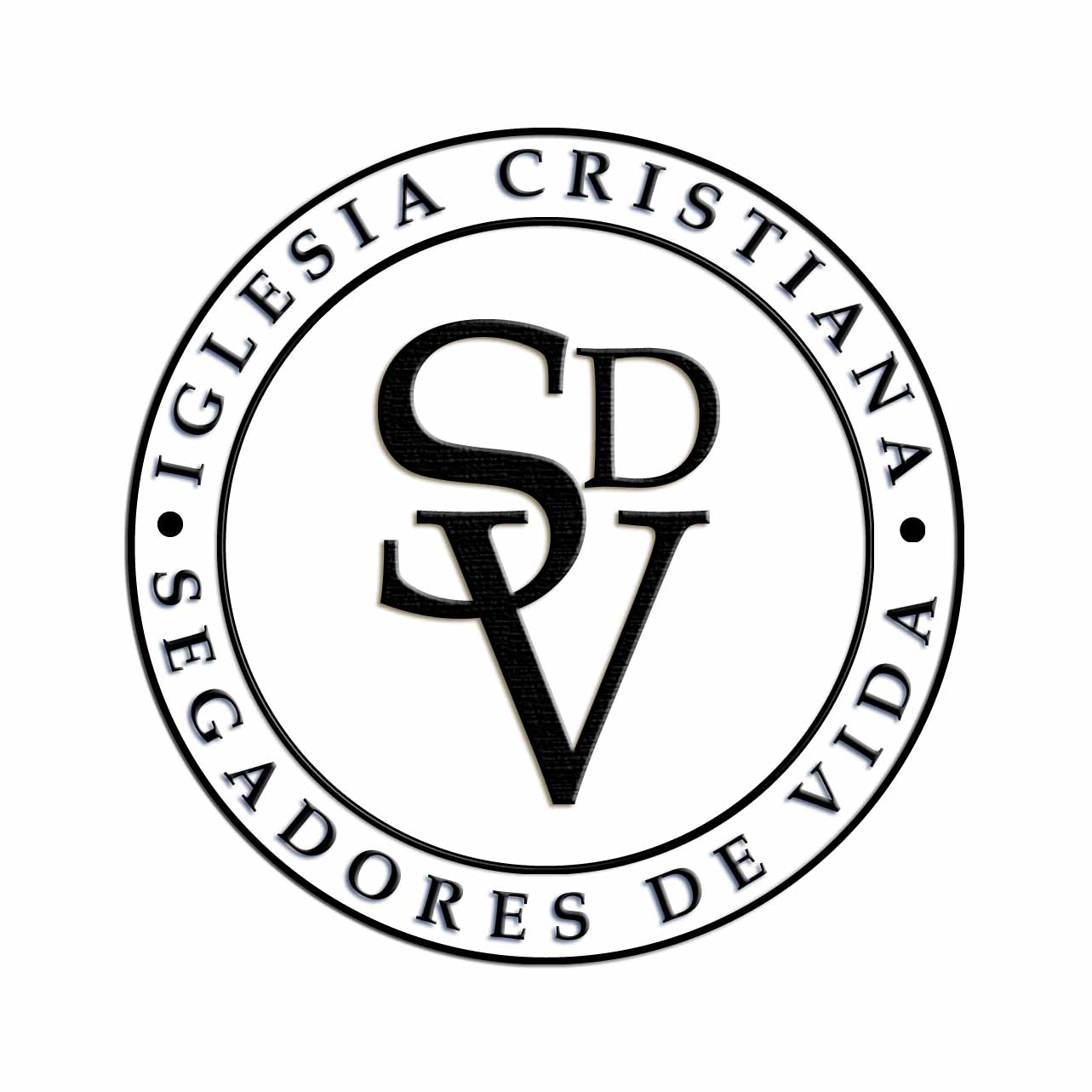

Segadores de Vida is a Non-denominational Christian church located in Southwest Ranches, Florida. The senior pastor of the church is Ruddy Gracia.

== History ==
The church was founded in April 1992, the Senior Pastors and founders are Ruddy and Maria Gracia. The Garcia's attended Christ for the Nations Institute in Dallas, Texas, for their biblical studies. They have focused on an outreach to the Hispanic community in South Florida. Their efforts have been covered in Strang Communications magazine Vida Cristiana and the evangelical Christian periodical, Outreach. The weekly attendance averages 8,000, including men, women, youth and children. In 2016, the church moved in to a new building in Southwest Ranches FL.

== See also ==
- List of the largest churches in the USA
