= LCBC =

- Lives Changed By Christ
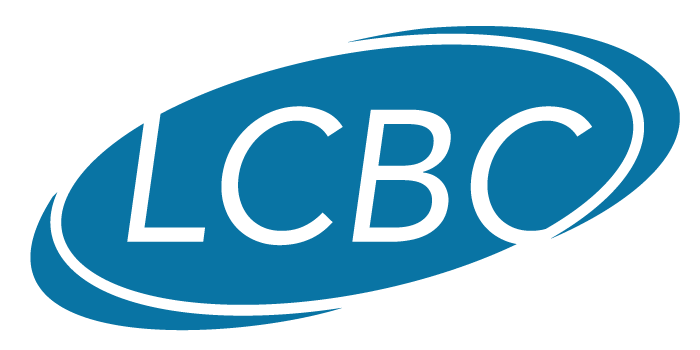
- Location: Pennsylvania
- Country: United States
- Denomination: Non-denominational
- Website: lcbcchurch.com

History
- Former name: Lancaster County Bible Church

LCBC (Lives Changed By Christ, formerly Lancaster County Bible Church) is a non-denominational Evangelical multi-site megachurch with twenty campuses in Pennsylvania. It was founded in 1986 and is now one of the largest churches in the United States.

== History ==
LCBC was officially formed as a Pennsylvania nonprofit corporation in December 1986. Its main campus is located in Rapho Township, Pennsylvania, approximately five miles southwest of the borough of Manheim, Pennsylvania. By 2011, it was the thirty-eighth largest church in the United States, with a weekly attendance of 10,147. LCBC has continued to grow: in 2013, it was the tenth fastest-growing church in the United States, with a weekly attendance of 13,854, twenty-seven percent larger than at the beginning of 2012. As of 2019, LCBC claimed 17,000 weekly attendees.

In 2006, LCBC's main campus had reached capacity, but further building expansion was ruled out by local officials. By then the church had shortened its name from Lancaster County Bible Church to "LCBC," a name change it made official in 2008. Shortly thereafter, LCBC opened its first satellite location in Swatara Township, Pennsylvania, near the state's capital, Harrisburg. At that time, LCBC's annual budget was roughly $9 million. Additional locations were then added in York, Lancaster, and Ephrata, Pennsylvania. In 2013, a sixth LCBC location, named LCBC BranchCreek, was opened in Harleysville, Pennsylvania when BranchCreek Community Church merged with LCBC. In early 2015, Emmanuel Bible Chapel (EBC) in Berwick, Pennsylvania, merged with LCBC. EBC was founded in 1978. In June 2016, Crosswalk Church in Waynesboro, Pennsylvania merged with LCBC. In June 2021, LCBC merged with Parker Hill Church and its three locations in Clarks Summit, Dickson City, and Wilkes Barre, Pennsylvania.

== Campus Locations ==
LCBC simulcasts the sermon portion of the service from the Manheim campus to its other campuses via video feed. Each campus has its own pastor, worship gatherings, small groups, and ministry opportunities.

- Manheim
- Harrisburg
- Lancaster City
- York
- Ephrata
- BranchCreek (Harleysville)
- Columbia-Montour (Bloomsburg)
- Berks (Leesport)
- Waynesboro
- Hazleton (Hazle Township)
- Hanover
- Coal Township
- West Shore (Mechanicsburg)
- Lebanon
- Clarks Summit
- Dickson City
- Wilkes Barre
- Northern Dauphin
- Willow Street
- Wyomissing
- West York
- Pottstown
- Church Online (While not a physical location, they also host a Live Stream)

== Beliefs ==
LCBC's doctrine is described as Evangelical Christian, with a high view of scripture, a belief in a loving trinitarian God and in the existence of Satan, and an emphasis on evangelism and missions. According to the LCBC website, members "believe the Bible is God's Word written by human authors under the guidance of the Holy Spirit. It is the ultimate source of truth for Christian beliefs and living. The Bible is true and without error."

== See also ==
- Nondenominational Christianity
- List of the largest Protestant churches in the United States
- Worship Center
