= Association of Related Churches =

Non-denominational evangelical association in the United States

- Classification: Non-denominational Evangelical
- Structure: Association
- President: Greg Surratt
- Founder: Billy Hornsby
- Origin: 2000
- Official website: www.arcchurches.com

The Association of Related Churches (ARC) is a non-denominational evangelical association and church planting organization in the United States. In 2000, Greg Surratt, founding pastor of Seacoast Church, met Billy Hornsby with a goal of planting 2,000 churches throughout the world. The association has planted over 1,100 churches as of 2025.

Churches that are part of the Association of Related Churches are mainly multi-site megachurches. Notable member churches include:

- Celebration Church: Jacksonville, Florida
- Christ Fellowship: Palm Beach Gardens, Florida
- Church of the Highlands: Birmingham, Alabama
- Oasis Church: Los Angeles, California
- Rock Church: San Diego, California
- Seacoast Church: Mount Pleasant, South Carolina
- Substance Church: Minneapolis, Minnesota

== See also ==
- Evangelicalism in the United States
- List of megachurches in the United States
- Cell church
