= Celebration Church =

- Location: Jacksonville, Florida (main campus)
- Denomination: Non-denominational Christianity
- Website: www.celebration.org

History
- Status: Active

Celebration Church is a multi-site church based in Jacksonville, Florida. It is a member of the Association of Related Churches. and is led by Senior Pastors Tim and Jen Timberlake.

== History ==
Celebration Church was founded in 1998 by Stovall Weems and his wife Kerri. The church grew to be a major presence in Northeast Florida.

In August 2011, the church broke ground on a new facility in Jacksonville, including a three-thousand seat arena-style sanctuary. The first services in the new "Celebration Arena" were held on November 11, 2012.

In 2022, the church had 12,000 parishioners and around 10 locations. The church's headquarters in Jacksonville is called the Arena. Other locations included Orlando, Amelia Island, North Carolina, South Florida, and Washington, D.C., as well as operations in the Netherlands, Paris, Belgium, Zimbabwe, and South Africa. Weems was the senior pastor and president of the church until 2021 when he started to shift his focus on missions. In 2021, Tim Timberlake became senior pastor and took over leadership of the Jacksonville church and its campuses in the US. In January 2022, Weems was suspended from his position by the church's trustees due to reports of possible financial improprieties which Weems disputes.

As of 2024, the church's locations include Jacksonville, FL; Orange Park, FL; Orlando, FL; Washington, DC; the Netherlands; South Africa; and Zimbabwe. The church plans to open a location in South Florida. Tim Timberlake is also the co-pastor of the Christian Faith Center in Creedmoor, NC with his mother.

== Beliefs ==
Regarding Scripture, Celebration Church believes that the Bible is the inspired word of God and the only authoritative word of God. They believe the Bible is inspired, infallible, and inerrant.

The church believes in the Trinity — one God, eternally existent in three persons: Father, Son and Holy Spirit.

Celebration Church has three sacraments: water baptism, the Lord's Supper, and marriage. Baptism is by faith in Jesus and performed in water in the Name of the Father and of the Son and of the Holy Spirit. The Lord's Supper is bread and grape juice, and is done in remembrance of Jesus' sacrifice. Marriage is viewed "as a covenant, a sacred bond between one man and one woman, instituted by and publicly entered into before God".

== Outreach ==
On July 13, 2024, Celebration Church had free grocery giveaway in Jacksonville. They provided free food to 2,000 families in need.

== Legal Disputes ==
In January 2022, Weems was suspended from his position in the church after a vote by the church's trustees. The trustees claimed there were reports of possible financial improprieties. Weems claimed there were financial improprieties, but denied that he committed them. In February 2022, Weems sued to get reinstated in his old position and said he wants "full and thorough investigation of any and all wrongdoing involving the church’s board of trustees, present and former officers, employees, and other parties and organizations that contributed to the dispute." Weems and his wife Kerri filed a lawsuit for injunctive relief against the church. They alleged that the church was improperly billed by a church trustee who tried to oust them. They also alleged that they were threatened with arrest if they entered church property. In response, the church filed a motion to dismiss the Weemses' injunction. In the motion, the church said this is the “latest chapter in a campaign of deception, manipulation, distraction, and abuse of power by Stovall and Kerri Weems against Celebration.” Also in the motion, the church alleged that the Weemses improperly used over $1 million in PPP loan proceeds to fund Honey Lake Farms, LLC – an entity they managed – and to purchase an illiquid, speculative digital currency called TurnCoin.

In July 2023, Stovall and Kerri Weems sued Association of Related Churches (ARC), a national-church planting organization which is associated with Celebration Church. The Weemses argue that ARC executive director Dino Rizzo, its co-founder Chris Hodges, and founding board member John Siebeling had been “working behind the scenes to oust Pastor Weems from his leadership position” at the church. In December 2024, the lawsuit was dismissed by a federal judge over concerns that handling it would violate the ecclesiastical abstention doctrine.

== See also ==
- List of the largest Protestant churches in the USA
- Non-denominational Christianity
