= Southland Christian Church (Lexington, Kentucky) =

Coordinates: 37.96980°N 84.59316°W

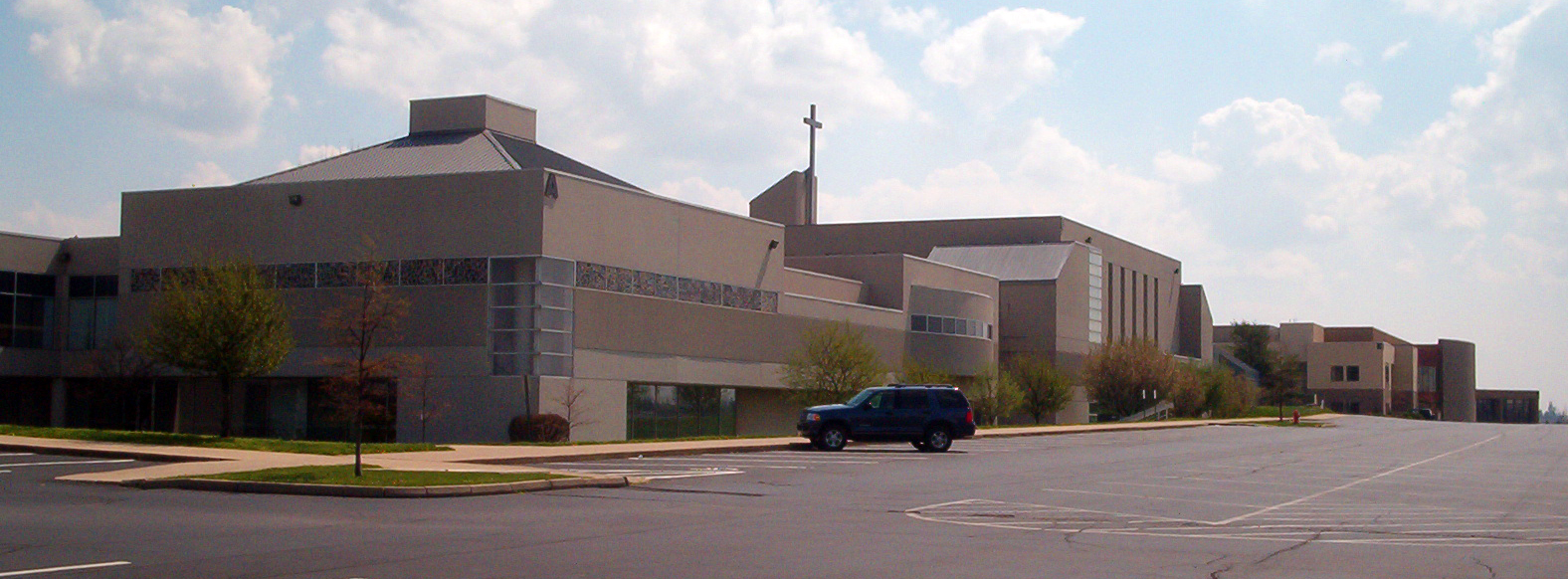
- View of Southland Christian Church from the corner of Brannon Road and U.S. Route 68
- Southland Christian Church
- Location: Nicholasville, Kentucky
- Country: United States
- Denomination: Evangelicalism
- Website: southland.church

History
- Founded: 1956

Southland Christian Church is a multi-site, Christian church movement megachurch with locations across the Greater Lexington, Kentucky area. Its primary location is in the unincorporated community of Brannon Woods, directly bordering Lexington (under a Nicholasville address). Its second largest location is in southeastern Lexington with other congregations in Richmond, Georgetown, and Danville.

Alongside Southeast Christian Church in Greater Louisville, it is one of the largest churches in Kentucky and one of the largest churches in the Restoration movement.

The church is associated with the Christian churches and churches of Christ. Scott Nickell became Senior Pastor in 2026. He stepped into the role following the retirement of Jon Weece, who concluded 26 years of faithful ministry at Southland that same year.

== Size and facility ==
Southland Christian Church is considered a megachurch. It is one of Kentucky's largest churches, averaging over 12,000 in attendance per weekend in 10 services - three in Nicholasville, two in Lexington, two at Danville, three at Georgetown, and three at Richmond.

The church has several ministries, including Helping Through Him (an on-site donation-based warehouse at the Nicholasville campus), care, outreach, Dollar Club, Jesus Prom, and more.

An online service is available.

== History ==
The church was founded in 1956 as a mission of Broadway Christian Church in Lexington, Kentucky. The founding pastor, Wayne Smith, came from Unity Christian Church near Cynthiana, Kentucky, and led the first service with 172 people in attendance. The church was originally located on Hill ’N Dale Drive near Southland Drive in Lexington. In 1981, following significant growth, the church relocated to a 20-acre site in neighboring Jessamine County. Over time, the property expanded to 115 acres.

Wayne Smith announced his retirement as Senior Pastor in 1995, at which point average weekly attendance had grown to several thousand. Mike Breaux, then pastor of Canyon Ridge Christian Church in Las Vegas, Nevada, was invited to preach as a guest and was subsequently hired as Senior Pastor. During his tenure, weekly attendance grew to more than 7,000. In 2000, Jon Weece joined the church as a teaching pastor, helping lead a congregation with six weekend services. After a building program that reduced the number of weekend services from six to five, Breaux accepted a position at Willow Creek Community Church in South Barrington, Illinois, and departed in 2003.

Jon Weece, a former missionary to Haiti, became the church's third Senior Pastor on September 1, 2003. At the time, he was in his twenties and was among the youngest senior pastors of a megachurch in the United States.

In 2009, the church opened its first satellite campus in Danville, Kentucky. The following year, it purchased the former Lexington Mall, with a campus opening at that location in January 2013. In 2015, the church began holding services in Georgetown, Kentucky, at Lemons Mill Elementary School.

In 2018, the church announced plans to launch a new campus in Richmond, Kentucky. Services began in 2020 at Madison Central High School, and a permanent Richmond campus was completed in 2024.

In 2026, Scott Nickell became Senior Pastor, following the retirement of Jon Weece after 26 years of ministry at the church.

== See also ==
- List of megachurches
