= Radicales51 =

Salvadoran rock band from El Salvador

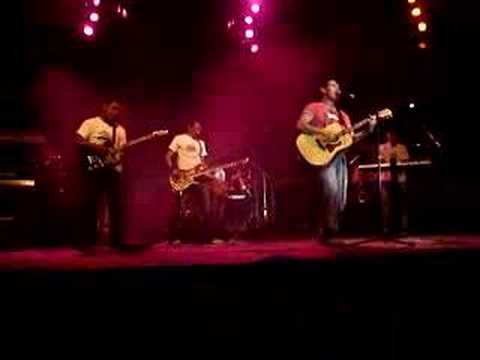
- Radicales51 Performing live in San Salvador

Background information
- Origin: San Salvador, El Salvador
- Genres: Alternative rock, indie rock, progressive rock CCM
- Years active: 2002–present
- Labels: 3:16 Media
- Members: Pablo Rosales, Erick Argueta, Rene Castillo, Dennis Antillón and Ricardo Escobar.
- Website: radicales51.com

Radicales51 is a Salvadoran rock band from San Salvador, El Salvador, formed in 2002. The band consists of lead vocalist Pablo Rosales, bassist Rene Castillo, guitarist Dennis Antillón, Drums Erick Argueta, and Keyboard Ricardo Escobar.

The group released its debut album 51 in 2004, and its second album Integral in 2007, which was awarded with a Premio Arpa for best independent band. Radicales51's third album Queremos que estes aqui was released in 2009, the band is focused in social matters and family strengthening throughout their songs and works in the gospel, aim of Radicales51 is to preach a message of Love, Faith and Hope.

== History ==
Radicales51 was formed in 2002, during the first visit of Dante Gebel to El Salvador, where Pablo Rosales participated as member of the choir for the event when he commented to his close friend Luis Mario Magana that he had written a song and wanted to record it. That project got the end becoming the very first album of the band. Soon after, they started touring in El Salvador gaining the support of many fans and fellows who later contributed to build up the great ministry that nowadays it is. 2007-2008 were years of great achievements such as Premio Arpa for best independent band, and the great singles such as "Basta Ya" (enough) inspired in the assassination of the drummer Erick Argueta's brother and the increasing rate of violence in El Salvador, due to the gangs, "Por el Desierto" (by the desert), "Si es amor" (If this is love), also they were signed by 3:16 Media, a Christian Label that keeps artists as Delirious?, Tom Brook, Lucía Parker, Paul Jackson Jr among others. Beside the work in music, Pablo Rosales lead singer wrote his short book titled "Varias Vidas, un papel y Mary” (A few lives, a paper sheet and Mary) which could be free downloaded from their web page.

== Discography ==
- 51 (2004)
- Integral (2007)
- Queremos que estes aqui (2009)

== Tours ==
- 51 Tour

From 2005 to 2006, Radicales51 got at least three gigs per week and began touring in El Salvador, and also visited Costa Rica, Guatemala, Nicaragua and Mexico.

- Integral Tour

From 2007 to 2009 this tour included gigs in Central America and six states of the United States and many dates performing in churches in El Salvador.

- Avivame Tour

From 2009 to 2010, in this tour Radicales51 focused in the connection between God and the church through worship so they began a campaign boosting the gigs at churches in their Sunday services they have been touring along El Salvador and Guatemala.

== Awards ==
- Premio Arpa
- Gospel FM 98.1 Award
