= City parish =

The city parish church ministry model or strategy is an approach to ministry that seeks to reach neighbors in a locality or city that are not normally reachable naturally through the location of a particular church.

Often, any given church is able to have influence on the immediate neighbors surrounding the physical location of the gathering place of that church. City parish strategy attempts to reach neighborhoods in multiple physical locations operating under a single extended body of leadership.

== See also ==
- Multi-site church - related, perhaps an ancestor model, but not identical
- Church planting
