= Faith Fellowship Ministries World Outreach Center =

Coordinates: 40.49285°N 74.29719°W

EPIC Church International
- EPIC Church International
- Location: Sayreville, New Jersey
- Country: United States
- Denomination: Non-denominational Christian
- Website: https://www.epicchurchintl.org/

History
- Founded: 1980

EPIC Church International, formerly Faith Fellowship Ministries World Outreach Center is an independent non-denominational Christian megachurch in Sayreville, New Jersey, USA. The pastor is John J. Wagner. As of 2013, Outreach Magazine ranked the church 44th in congregation size in the US, with weekly attendance of 10,100.

== History ==
David T. Demola founded Faith Fellowship Ministries in early 1980, and by the end of that year was able to move from a private home to St. Mark's United Methodist Church in Staten Island, New York. The growing congregation temporarily held services at an Elks Club, and then in July 1982 moved to a former synagogue in Iselin, New Jersey. Still growing, in mid-1985 the church moved into a newly constructed 1,300-seat facility in Edison, New Jersey, its base for the next fifteen years. However, overflow crowds and limited parking created tensions with neighbors.

In July 2000 the current 2,900-seat auditorium and office complex was established on a 14-acre (57,000 m^{2}) site in Sayreville that was once used by Public Service Electric and Gas Company as a training center. The site was selected in part because it already had sufficient parking space, a significant factor with urban megachurches. In 2003 the center launched a homeownership program through its nonprofit affiliate, the Faith Fellowship Community Development Corporation, which provides education and coaching in financial planning.

After Pastor David T. Demola's passing in 2018, Pastor Wagner took over as lead pastor.

On January 1, 2019, the church announced on its website and social media pages its transition to EPIC Church International.

== See also ==
- List of the largest Protestant churches in the USA
