= Inspiring Body of Christ Church =

Coordinates: 32.651°N 96.889°W

- Inspiring Body of Christ Church
- Location: Dallas, Texas
- Country: United States
- Denomination: Non-denominational
- Website: www.ibocchurch.org

History
- Founded: 1990; 36 years ago

Clergy
- Pastor: Rickie Rush

The Inspiring Body of Christ Church (IBOC) is a non-denominational megachurch in Dallas, Texas in the United States. A survey by Outreach Magazine in 2008 ranked the church 87th in the US based on weekly attendance of 7,500 and has since grown to 15,000 members. It describes itself as a "high praising, high worship, Bible believing church". The pastor is Rickie Rush.

== History ==
The church was founded and organized by Pastor Rickie Rush and nine others in 1990. Its first service was in October 1990. In 1991, the church bought its first building, the former Southern Bible Institute. In 2009, the church moved to its present location, a 176,000-square-foot (16,400 m^{2}) facility on a 36-acre (150,000 m^{2}) campus.

In 1995, it formed a radio ministry. On October 3, 1999, the IBOC church relocated to a $6 million, 176,000-square-foot campus in Dallas, Texas. The facility has an ice cream parlor, movie theater, fitness center, racquetball courts, bowling lanes, and a bridal venue. In 2000, the church opened the IBOC Children's College for pre-schoolers, and in 2001 opened the IBOC Christian Academy for grades one to four.

On November 26, 2009, IBOC moved into a new worship center featuring a 5,000-seat sanctuary, an aquarium, a chapel, children's facilities, a restaurant, and a gift shop. The aquarium is the largest privately owned aquarium in the United States, holding 75,000 gallons of water, and was featured on Animal Planet's show, Tanked.

At IBOC in January 2017, Veteran Dallas County Deputy Tracey Gully took the oath of office as Dallas County Precinct 1 Constable. Gulley is the first African-American Female Constable elected in Dallas County history.

In April 2020, Pastor Rush was among the list of Dallas faith leaders who signed a letter in support of keeping churches closed to reduce the spread of the coronavirus.

The funeral service for 9-year-old for Ezra Blount, the youngest victim of the tragedy at the Astroworld Festival, was held at the Inspiring Body of Christ Church in Dallas in November 2021.

== Community Outreach ==
In response to a shooting that claimed the lives of five Dallas police officers, Pastor Rush founded the All Male Leadership Academy. Each level consists of 15 classes spanning four months, and topics include suicide prevention, marriage, anxiety, singleness, depression, child-rearing, and strength. On December 30, 2016, the first class of 302 men completed the first level of training.

On July 30, 2017, IBOC and Pastor Rickie Rush held a candlelight vigil for all of the young, unknown victims of tragic, untimely deaths. During the event, the church offered support to parents, siblings, and friends grieving the loss of a young person close to them.

In November 2020, the church donated over 1,000 turkeys and over 2,000 boxes of fresh food for those in need during the thanksgiving season.

In December 2020, the church committed $100,000 to senior citizens for rental assistance.

== See also ==
- List of the largest churches in the USA
