= Church of the Highlands =

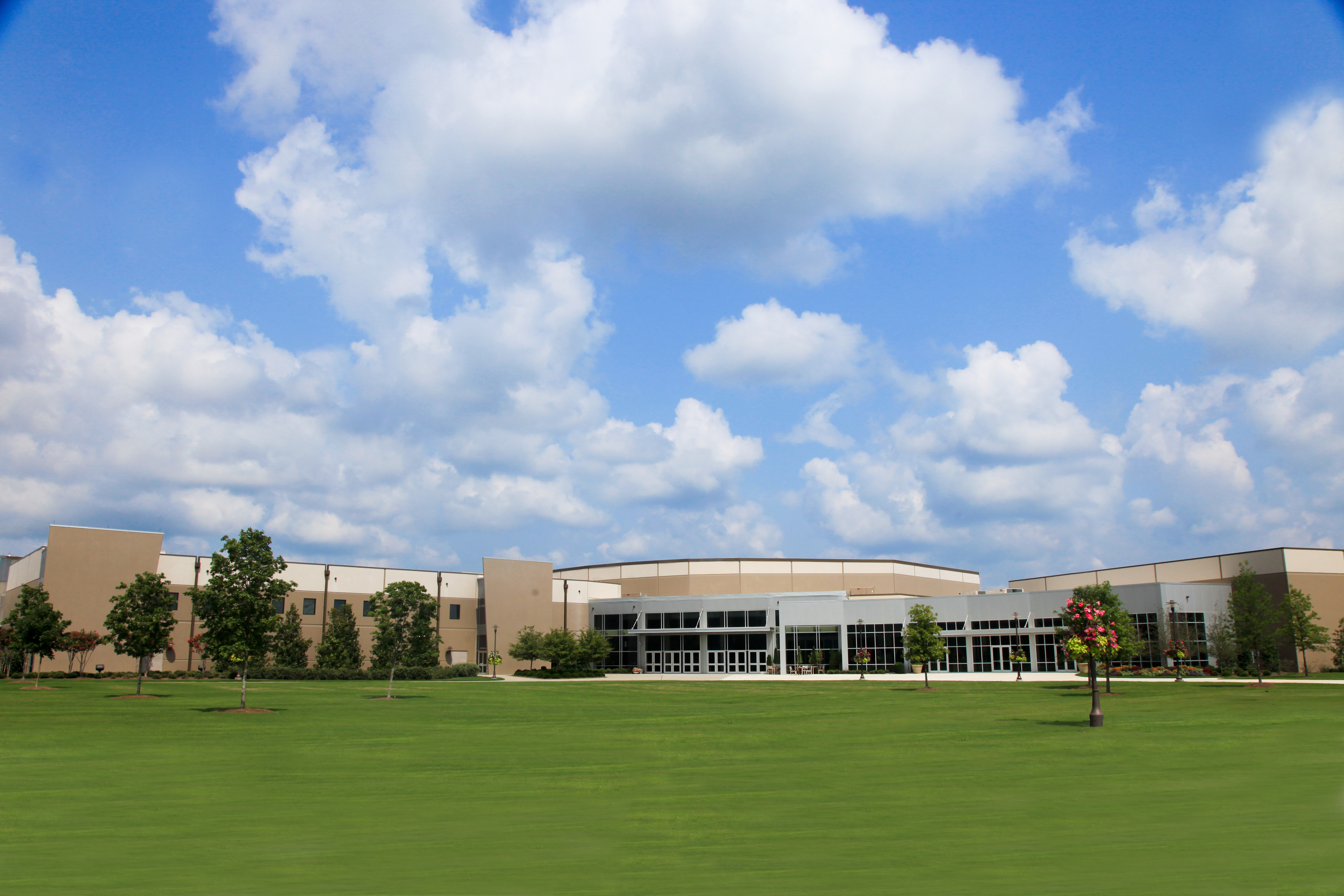
- Grants Mill Campus
- Church of the Highlands
- 33°30′59.45″N 86°39′20.53″W
- Location: Birmingham, Alabama
- Country: United States
- Denomination: Non-denominational, Evangelical
- Website: churchofthehighlands.com

History
- Founded: February 4, 2001
- Founder: Chris Hodges

Church of the Highlands is a non-denominational evangelical Christian multi-site megachurch based in Birmingham, Alabama. It is the largest congregation in Alabama with an average of 60,000 attendees every week and 26 campuses as of 2025. The lead pastor is currently Mark Pettus.

== History ==
The church was founded on February 4, 2001, by Chris Hodges and a core group of 34 people. In 2007, it opened its main building, with a 2,400-seat auditorium. The church has opened numerous campuses in the local Birmingham area, the state of Alabama, and two in Georgia.

In November 2018, CBS News listed Church of the Highlands as the tenth largest megachurch in the United States with about 22,184 weekly visitors.

In the "Outreach 100" listing for 2022, Church of the Highlands was ranked second with attendance of more than 60,000 each week; it was ranked first in the previous listing in 2018.

As of April 10, 2025, Church of the Highlands listed 27 campuses in Alabama and Georgia. Its most recently built campus is the Opelika campus in Opelika, Alabama that hosted its first services on April 13, 2025 for Easter weekend.

In 2023, the church opened "The Lodge at Grants Mill" on its main campus in Irondale, Alabama. The lodge functions as a place where pastors can rest according to Hodges. It is part of Hodges's effort to host pastors needing to be "refreshed, rejuvenated and refocused on their calling" during a time when "pastoral burnout is at an all-time high."

According to a 2025 church census, it claimed a weekly attendance of 60,000 people and 26 campuses.

== Affiliations ==
Church of the Highlands is affiliated with the Association of Related Churches (ARC). Its pastoral staff are among the founding members of ARC.

Highlands College was founded by Church of the Highlands staff. Students of the college serve on various teams at the church. Highlands College states that they offer, "a unique approach to higher education through a holistic training experience," and focus on four areas of instruction: academic instruction, ministry training, character formation, and spiritual development. In 2023, the college was granted initial accreditation by the Association for Biblical Higher Education Commission on Accreditation.

== See also ==
- List of megachurches in the United States
- List of the largest evangelical churches
- List of the largest evangelical church auditoriums
