= Jim Burgen =

American priest

- Born: April 5, 1962
- Occupation: Pastor

Jim Burgen is the senior pastor at Flatirons Community Church, a non-denominational evangelical church in Lafayette, Colorado.

Jim is a graduate of Milligan College, and he is a youth ministry veteran. He was road pastor to Christian bands Audio Adrenaline and the O.C. Supertones, and then Youth Minister at Southern Acres Christian Church, he then became director of student ministries at Southeast Christian Church in Louisville, Kentucky. He next became associate pastor at Southland Christian Church, Lexington, Kentucky before coming to Flatirons.

He says Flatirons identifies with all people, whoever they are and whatever problems they have, and offers an unconditionally loving and safe place. A favorite phrase when discussing problems is "Me Too".

== Bibliography ==
- Jim Burgen (2014). No More Dragons:Get Free from Broken Dreams, Lost Hope, Bad Religion, and Other Monsters. Thomas Nelson. ISBN 140020562X.
- Jim Burgen, Scott Nickell (2011). Grow a Pair. Amazon Digital Services, Inc.
- Jim Burgen, Scott Nickell (2011). PB&J: Key Ingredients for a Better Marriage. Amazon Digital Services, Inc.
- Jim Burgen, Scott Nickell (2011). All My Life. Amazon Digital Services, Inc.
- Jim Burgen (2001). What's the Big Deal about My Parents?. Standard Publishing. ISBN 0-7847-1252-2.
- Jim Burgen (1999). What's the Big Deal About Sex: Loving God's Way. Standard Pub. ISBN 0-7847-1099-6.
