= David Dykes =

David Dykes may refer to:

- D. L. Dykes Jr. (David L. Dykes, Jr., 1917–1997), progressive Methodist minister from Shreveport, Louisiana
- David O. Dykes (born 1953), conservative Baptist pastor from Tyler, Texas
- David Dykes, reporter at The Greenville News

== See also ==
- David Dyke (disambiguation)
