= Abundant Church =

Coordinates: 31°42′56″N 106°18′41″W

- Abundant Church
- Country: United States
- Denomination: Non-denominational Word of Faith
- Website: http://www.abundant.org/

History
- Founded: 1977

Abundant Church is a nondenominational, multicultural, evangelical church in El Paso, Texas, United States, with about 20,000 members in 2009. The Pastor is Charles Nieman. The church is part of the Word of Faith movement, giving Abundant life teachings.

== History ==
Pastors Charles and Rochelle Nieman started preaching the Gospel in 1977, holding services in a small railroad hall in El Paso. On December 30, 2012, Rochelle Nieman died after a long battle with cancer; she was 62. By 2008, after steady growth of their congregation, Abundant Living Faith Center had more than 15,000 active members and about 8,000 worshipers attending services weekly at the new 3,620-seat facility.

By 2009, it ranked number 41 by size on the Outreach Magazine's list of largest churches in the USA.

In 2017, the church opened a campus on the west side of El Paso. The 89,000 square foot building has a performing arts-style theater where services are held. It has 1,900 seats, a bookstore, and two cafes.

In February 2019, the church announced it would be opening a third worship site in downtown El Paso. The new location opened its doors in 2023.

Previously the church supported Faith Christian Academy, a private school established in 1980 and closed in 2020. The school was home to more than 500 students from K-3 through to 12th grade. In 2012 and 2013, Faith Christian Lions Varsity basketball team won back to back TCAL state championships In 2006, the football team won the TCAL 6-man state championship and finished the season ranked #2 for Texas 6-man Private Schools. In August 2009, the church gave away over 1,100 backpacks filled with school supplies, of which 800 went to children in the El Paso area and 300 to children in the Dominican Republic.

== See also ==
- List of the largest churches in the USA
