= North Coast Church =

Multi-site megachurch in Vista, California

Coordinates: 33.236°N 117.255°W

- North Coast Church
- Location: Vista, California
- Country: United States
- Denomination: Evangelicalism
- Website: northcoastchurch.com

History
- Status: Active
- Founded: 1976

North Coast Church is a multi-site megachurch based in Vista, California, roughly 30 miles (48 km) north of San Diego. It is affiliated with the Evangelical Free Church of America.

== Locations ==
•Vista, CA

•Carlsbad, CA

•Fallbrook, CA

•Los Barriles, BCS, Mexico

•Pauma Valley, CA

•Ramona, CA

•Rancho Bernardo, CA

•San Marcos/Escondido, CA

•Temecula, CA

•Hillsboro, OH

•Kailua, HI

•Prescott, AZ

•Sacramento Region, CA

North Coast also hosts a virtual campus, which can be accessed through their website. https://my.northcoastchurch.com/

== History ==
The church was founded as a Bible study in 1976 in a Carlsbad home.

Between all 9 campuses there are multiple worship services offered every weekend. Instead of a single large sanctuary, the campuses feature separate worship venues (live and video venues), each of which holds less than 1000 people, and all of which can be in worship at the same time with the same sermon but different atmosphere, music and feel.

The church is built around a small group lecture/lab model that digs deeper into the topic of the weekend message. Since 1985, attendance in these small groups has equaled 80-94% of weekend adult attendance.

The church also places a high emphasis on community service - averaging nearly 2 service projects per day and periodically, cancelling all worship services to send out worshipers to work on charitable projects throughout the community instead of attending church that weekend.

The church moved in a new building in 2010 after spending 20 years in an industrial complex.
