= Seacoast Church =

American non-denominational church in South Carolina

- Location: Charleston, South Carolina
- Country: United States
- Denomination: Evangelicalism
- Website: seacoast.org

History
- Status: Active
- Founded: 1988
- Founder: Greg Surratt

Clergy
- Pastor: Josh Surratt

Seacoast is a non-denominational evangelical multi-site megachurch based in Mount Pleasant, South Carolina, a suburb of Charleston. It has fifteen locations around South Carolina and North Carolina. It is a member of the Association of Related Churches, a church-planting organization. Its senior pastor is Josh Surratt.

== History ==
The church began in February 1988 with 100 people meeting in an apartment clubhouse by Greg Surratt and a team from Northwood Assembly, another large church in North Charleston. In April of the same year the first 'public' meetings were held in a rented theater with a vision for reaching out to the unchurched people of the Charleston area. The church grew quickly with its contemporary worship style and support from its mother church, Northwood Assembly.

In 2002, the church had over 3,000 people attending weekly services, leading them to request permits to expand their facilities with local officials. The town of Mount Pleasant denied all requests, however. The church then began to use a video feed to show sermons to an off-site location. This was so successful that Seacoast began to open other "satellite" facilities throughout the Charleston metropolitan area and throughout the state and now in North Carolina.

In 2007, it opened a Dream Center.

In 2019, it dedicated a new building in Mount Pleasant including a 2,500-seat auditorium.

In 2023, the church claimed to have a weekly attendance of 14,000 people and had opened 13 campuses in different cities.

== Beliefs ==
Seacoast church is a mainstream evangelical church, non-denominational, as for much of the mainstream, but characterised by evangelical teachings. It states its "sole basis for [its] belief is the Bible." The statement of faith is Trinitarian and states that the Bible is infallible. The statement affirms the belief that Jesus Christ "lived a sinless life on earth and voluntarily paid for our sin by dying on the cross as our substitute." and that "He rose from the dead and is the only mediator between us and God."

== Notable members ==
- Brandon Lake
- Tim Scott
- Nancy Mace
