= King's Cathedral and Chapels =

- Country: United States
- Denomination: Pentecostal
- Website: kingscentral.net

History
- Former name: First Assembly of God Maui
- Founded: 1980
- Founder(s): Dr. James Marocco & Pastor Colleen Marocco

King's Cathedral and Chapels, sometimes referred to as King's or KC, is an international Pentecostal multi-site megachurch based in Kahului, Hawaii. It is affiliated with the Assemblies of God USA. The church, originally called First Assembly of God Maui, was established in the year of 1980 by the church's current Global Senior Pastors, Dr. James Marocco and Pastor Colleen Marocco.

== History ==
In 1935, a Pentecostal missionary couple, James Creighton and Juanita Creighton, moved to the island of Maui after Juanita had been healed of a cancerous tumor. They began to preach in Paia, Hawaii and founded the Full Gospel Church of Paia. In 1949, Juanita Creighton retired and handed her church over to the Assemblies of God, who had assigned pastors to the church over periods of years. Prior to 1980, the church sold their property in Paia, Hawaii and moved down to Kahului, Hawaii and constructed the Kane Street Chapel by hand. Before the Maroccos became the official pastors, the church had done a media blitz through radio and newspapers, of which First Assembly of God Maui was also the first church on Maui to do.

In 1980, Dr. James Marocco and Colleen Marocco became the new Senior Pastors of First Assembly of God Maui. On their first official Sunday as the Senior Pastors, the size of the congregation doubled from 100 to 200, causing it to become the largest Evangelical church on the island. In three months, the church grew to 300 congregants. By the end of their first year of ministry, they grew to 700 congregants, with their one-year anniversary celebration being held in a high school gymnasium, numbering over 2,500 attendees, being the largest Christian gathering on the island of Maui in over 150 years. During this period, First Assembly of God Maui became one of the fastest-growing churches in the United States.

In 1982, to be able to accommodate the growth of the church, First Assembly purchased what was then the Maui Skate Palace, the largest auditorium at the time, and renovated it to serve as a church building. In 1983, First Assembly of God adopted the multi-site church model, establishing extension churches in Kaunakakai, Hawaii and Lahaina, Hawaii, now believing to be one church on the three islands of Maui County: Maui, Molokai, and Lanai. The church had also begun it's ethno-linguistic ministries, establishing the Filipino Ministry. In 1984, Dr. James Marocco began efforts to purchase property on what is now the corner of Maui Veterans Highway and Airport Road, the busiest intersection on the island of Maui. Dr. James Marocco's father, Pastor Daniel Marocco, had joined his staff team after having previously served as the senior pastor for what was then Bethel Manila Temple (currently the Cathedral of Praise). He established early morning prayer meetings, which are currently replicated among the numerous extensions across the world.

On February 1, 1988, First Assembly of God closed escrow on the property on the corner of Maui Veterans Highway and Airport Road, and the church began construction on the cathedral, the central hub for the church as a whole and the largest church facility throughout the State of Hawaii. By 1989, an extension church had been established on Lanai, which fulfilled the church's vision of being one church on three islands.

In 1994, First Assembly finished construction on the cathedral. In 1995, the church held a series of revival meetings with Evangelist Rodney Howard-Browne, which caused the church to change. First, they established the Prophetic Conference (currently the Power Conference), in which registered attendees are personally prophesied over in call-out rooms. Second, they began to establish extension churches outside of Maui County, with the first wave of extension campuses established before the year 2000 being Honokaa, Hawaii; ʻEleʻele, Hawaii; Honolulu, Hawaii; Wasilla, Alaska; Seattle, Washington; Antioch, California; Iwakuni, Japan; Tahiti; and Tonga. Lastly, it solidified their place among the Apostolic-Prophetic Movement, accepting certain Christian figures as being apostles and prophets.

In 2000, First Assembly of God Maui changed their name to King's Cathedral and Chapels to avoid confusion with an already existing church named "First Assembly of God". The central hub in Kahului, Hawaii was referred to as either "King's Cathedral Maui" or "King's Cathedral" with the other extension campuses being referred to as either "King's Chapel", "KC", or "King's" with the location in front.

In August 2023, the church provided shelter for the victims of the 2023 Hawaii wildfires.

== Organization ==
Currently, Dr. James Marocco and Pastor Colleen Marocco serve together jointly as the Global Senior Pastors of King's Cathedral and Chapels. For their extensions in the United States, official members of King's elect candidates to take positions in the board of directors. The Board of Directors assists the Senior Pastoral Leadership in making certain financial decisions. Eligible candidates are determined prior to the elections, and all candidates are already existing official members of the church.

== Affiliations ==
King's Cathedral and Chapels is officially a part of the Assemblies of God USA, being a part of the Hawaii District of the Assemblies of God.

Dr. James Marocco serves as on the board of directors for Christ for the Nations Institute in Dallas, Texas. He is also a Board Member of Church Growth International, an international church growth organization promoting the growth of churches across the world.

== Controversy ==
In March 2021, the church was linked to a cluster of cases of COVID-19. The church was asked to stop in-person events by the Hawaii Department of Health, but it refused.
