= Brannon Woods, Kentucky =

Unincorporated community in Kentucky, United States

Coordinates: 37°58′23″N 84°35′35″W

Brannon Woods is an unincorporated community in Jessamine County, Kentucky, United States.

Brannon Woods began growing along U.S. Route 68 as Lexington rapidly grew to the southwest and began running out of land. The first developments in the area began in the 1980s when several subdivisions were built along Brannon Road.

Southland Christian Church, Lexington's largest church and the second-largest church in Kentucky, moved to a 20-acre (8.1 ha; 81,000 m^{2}) site in Brannon Woods in 1981. In 2001 Bellerive Shopping Center was completed in the community. In 2005 US 68 was widened from Brannon Road to Man O War Blvd in Lexington, and in 2010 it was widened southward to Wilmore. Blue Grass Memorial Garden Cemetery is also located in Brannon Woods.
