= Charles Nieman =

American pastor

- Born: 1949 (age 76–77)
- Occupation: Pastor
- Spouses: Rochelle Nieman (m. 1970; died 2012) Lynn Nieman (m. 2016)
- Children: Shannon and Jared Nieman
- Website: http://www.charlesnieman.com/

Charles Nieman is a pastor of Abundant Church, a non-denominational megachurch in El Paso, Texas, United States. His church was rated as the 31st fastest growing church and 41st in size in 2008 by Outreach Magazine.

Charles Nieman was born and brought up in El Paso. While studying at the University of Texas at El Paso in his early 20s, he decided to become a preacher, having also met his wife, Rochelle, there. He was influenced by Tommy Barnett, whom he calls his pastor, of the Phoenix First Assembly of God.

Charles and Rochelle Nieman began preaching in 1977 to a congregation of 20 people in a small railroad union hall in El Paso. Since then, their church has grown to over 23,000+ members. The Niemans' message focuses on the Abundant Life that Jesus came to give. Nieman is a regular speaker at Christian conferences. Apart from public appearances, he has written several books, and his work is available on iTunes Podcasts.

== Bibliography ==
- Charles Nieman (1983). Wisdom & guidance. Word of Faith. ISBN 0-914307-19-3.
- Charles Nieman (1983). Prayer: An Invitation from God. Word of Faith Pub. ISBN 0-914307-03-7.
- Charles Nieman (1983). Leadership: You Can Have What It Takes. Robert Tilton Ministries. ISBN 0-914307-08-8.
- Charles Nieman (1985). God's Plan for Your Financial Success. Robert Tilton Ministries. ISBN 0-914307-34-7.
- Charles Nieman (1988). Living Smart. Harrison House, Incorporated. ISBN 0-89274-477-4.
- Charles Nieman (2000). Becoming A Master Asker. Creation House. ISBN 0-88419-694-1.
