= Oasis Church (Los Angeles) =

Christian church in Los Angeles

Coordinates: 34.062118°N 118.300064°W

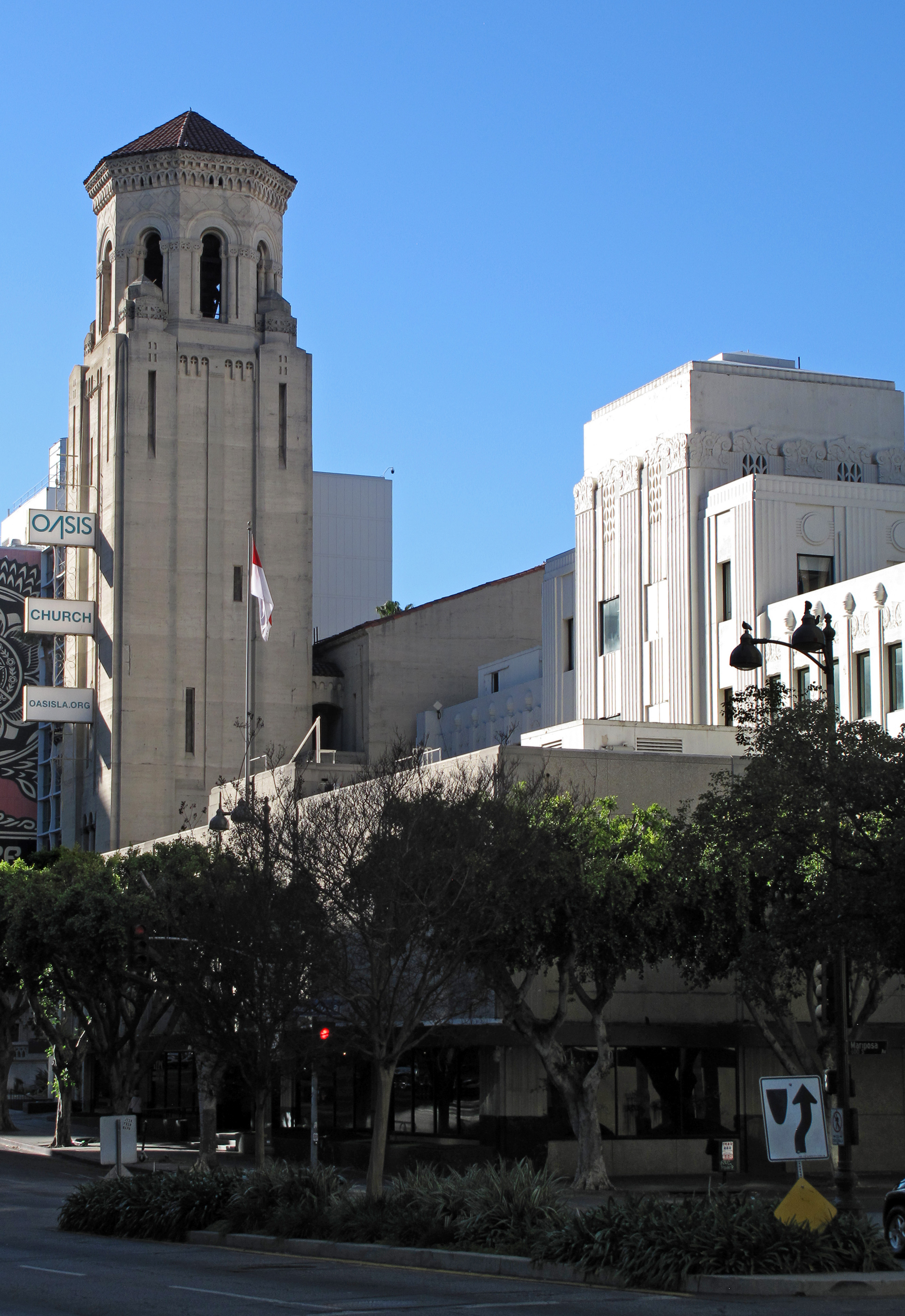
- Interactive map of the Oasis Church area

General information
- Location: 634 South Normandie Avenue, Los Angeles, California

Oasis Church is a Christian church in Los Angeles, California affiliated with the Association of Related Churches (ARC). Its building is listed as a Los Angeles Historic-Cultural Monument under the name Wilshire Christian Church Building.

== Oasis Church history ==
The church began as a Bible-study group of ten people in Beverly Hills, California in 1984. From that community, Philip and Holly Wagner decided to found a church, which had about thirty initial parishioners. One of the original members of the Bible-study group was singer Donna Summer, and more recent members include Viola Davis. The congregation moved to the Oasis Theatre in the 1990s, and to the Wilshire Christian Church during the 2010s. By the 2010s, the church had more than three thousand members. It is known for the diversity of its fellowship. The church issues funds to support international poverty initiatives, including care for widows, orphans, as well as clean drinking water projects. The church also embedded a star, similar to those on the Hollywood Walk of Fame, for Jesus Christ on the sidewalk in front of its then-location on Wilshire Boulevard in 1998, with the intention of creating a “Walk of Faith”.

== Wilshire Christian Church ==
The building was built in 1927 as a new home of the Wilshire Christian Church. It was designed by architect Robert H. Orr. It was listed as Los Angeles Historic-Cultural Monument #209 in 1979.

== See also ==
- List of Los Angeles Historic-Cultural Monuments in the Wilshire and Westlake areas
