= Christ Fellowship =

- Location within Florida
- 26.8106°N 80.1226°W
- Country: United States
- Denomination: Non-denominational, Evangelical
- Website: christfellowship.church

History
- Founded: 1984
- Founder(s): Dr. Tom and Donna Mullins

Christ Fellowship is a non-denominational evangelical multi-site megachurch based in Palm Beach Gardens, Florida with more than 28,000 in attendance each week on eleven locations throughout South Florida. It is affiliated with the Association of Related Churches (ARC).

== History ==
Christ Fellowship started in 1984 as a small Bible study with 40 people in Dr. Tom and Donna Mullins' living room and has grown to be one of the largest churches in America. Tom resigned from his job as athletic director at the Palm Beach State College in March 1985 to pursue ministry full-time.

The first church building, which seated 800 people, was converted from a riding stable. Initial plans for a larger campus, located at the intersection of Northlake Boulevard and Gibson Road, were strongly opposed by local residents. However, the Palm Beach Gardens city council allowed the church to be built, based on revised plans including more parking, lower lights, and a wall on its north side.

In November 2018, CBS News listed Christ Fellowship as the 16th largest megachurch in the United States with about 18,965 weekly visitors.

Led by Pastor Todd and Julie Mullins, Christ Fellowship is based in Palm Beach Gardens, Florida.

Christ Fellowship's Teaching Pastor is Dr. John C. Maxwell.

The church operates eight campuses in Palm Beach County; additionally, campuses in Port St. Lucie, FL, Vero Beach, FL, and Okeechobee, FL, totalling to twelve (plus their Online Campus). The church plans to open a campus in the new municipality of Westlake, Florida.
