= Pinelake Church =

Coordinates: 32.326257°N 90.330150°W

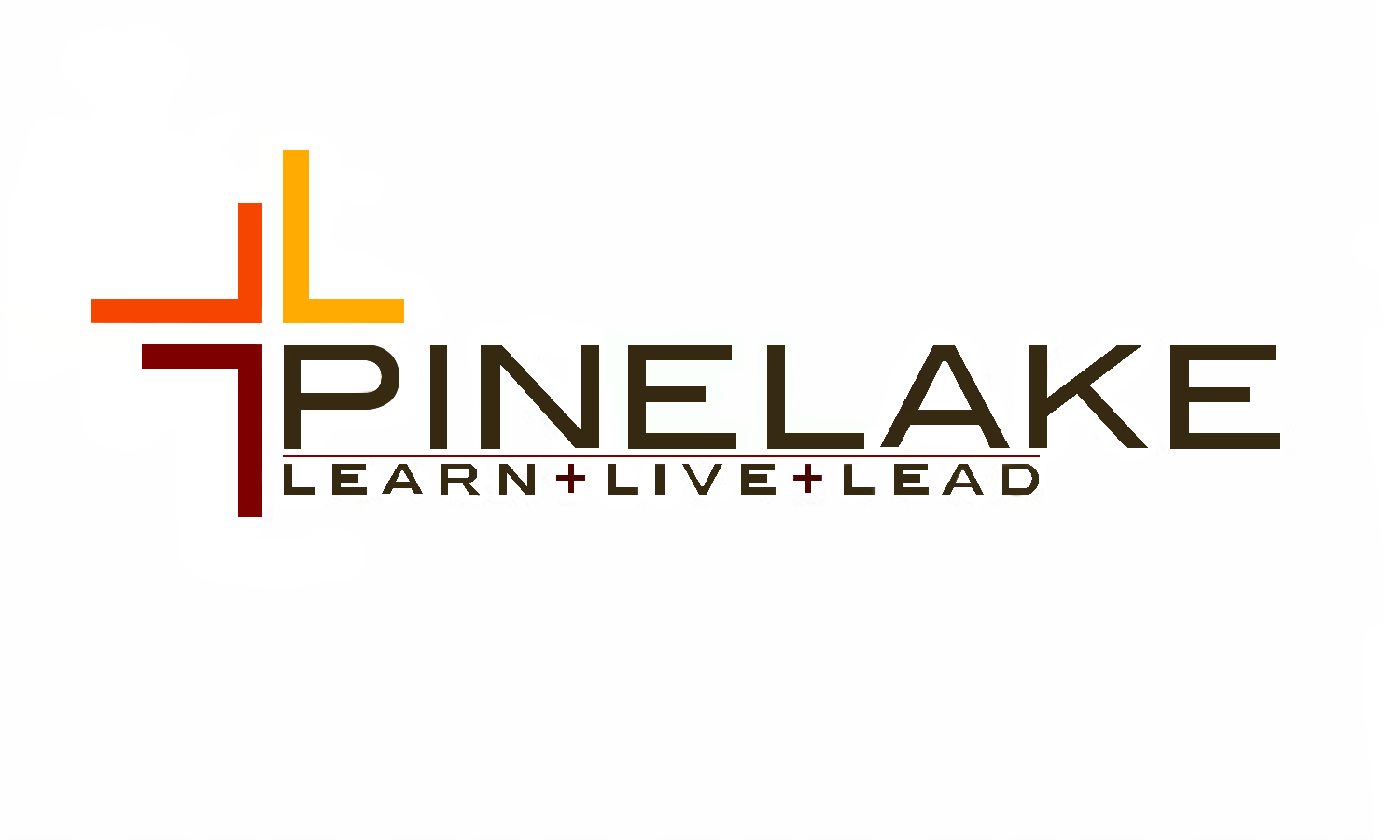
- Pinelake Church Logo
- Pinelake Church
- Location: Brandon, Mississippi, U.S.
- Country: United States of America
- Denomination: Baptist
- Website: www.pinelake.org

History
- Founded: 21 March 1971

Architecture
- Groundbreaking: November 2000
- Completed: 2003

Pinelake Church is a Baptist multi-site megachurch based in Brandon, Mississippi, United States. It is affiliated with the Southern Baptist Convention.

== History ==
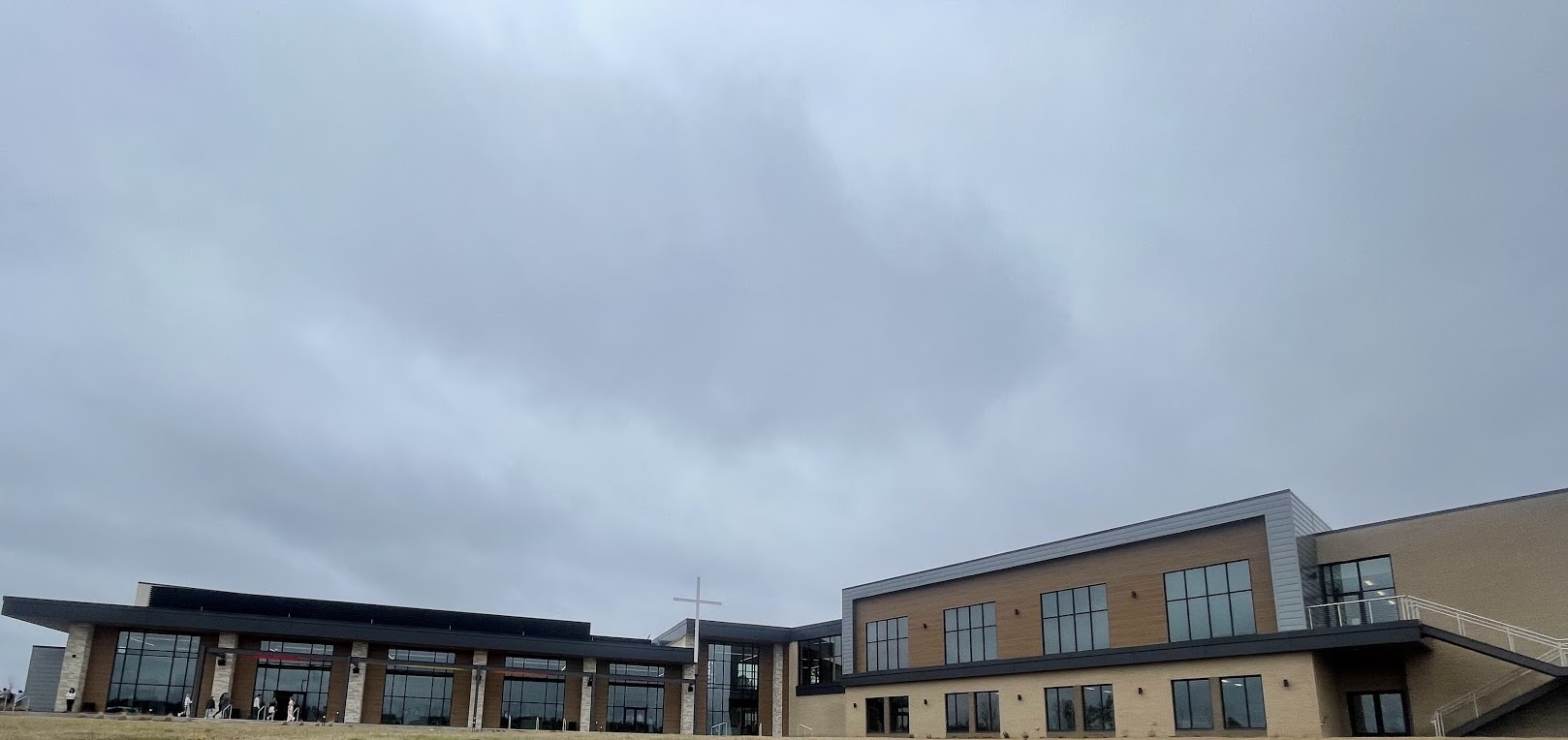
Pinelake Church Oxford, Mississippi.

Pinelake Church was established in February 1971 at a home on Bay Park Drive in Brandon. The first worship service was held on March 21 as Rankin Baptist Chapel with 32 people in a mobile chapel on Spillway Road in Brandon.

JC Renfroe, Director of Mission for the Rankin County Baptist Association, served as the first Interim Pastor from 1971 until February 10, 1974. The church's first full-time pastor, Gary Watkins, served from February 17, 1974 until 1976. Subsequent pastors were Lannie Wilbourn, who served from August 1977 until July 1995, and Tommy Politz, who served from March 1997 until July 1998.

Chip Henderson took over as pastor in January 1999, and the church began to grow quickly. In February 2000, church leaders began to look for a new location. In November 2000, the church purchased 170 acres of land on Lakeland Drive. The church began to build a new facility on the land, and opened this new campus with services in November 2003.

Through 2004 and 2005, weekly attendance increased by 1,500 people, bringing the Sunday attendance to more than 4,000.

In the fall of 2006, the church opened a second campus in the Madison-Ridgeland area, meeting at Ridgeland High School. More campuses followed: in Clinton in January 2009, in Starkville in 2011, in Gluckstadt in April 2012, and in Oxford in 2015.

The church has also spent money to train new ministers, expand its global mission, and develop resources. It runs an 11-month Ascend internship program and a Church Planting Residency.

According to a church census released in 2023, it claimed a weekly attendance of 9,604 people and 5 campuses in different cities.
