= David Dyke =

David Dyke may refer to:

- David Hart Dyke, Royal Navy officer
- Sir David William Hart Dyke, 10th Baronet (born 1955) of the Dyke baronets

== See also ==
- David Dykes (disambiguation)
