= James River Church =

Largest church in Missouri

- James River Church
- James River Church
- Location: Ozark, Missouri
- Country: United States
- Denomination: Pentecostal
- Website: jamesriver.church

History
- Founded: 1991

James River Church is a Pentecostal multi-site megachurch based in Ozark, Missouri with other locations in Springfield and Joplin, Missouri.

== History ==
James River Church was founded by four couples, Rodger and Caressa Gadd, Gary and Debbie Simms, Tim and Carol Carpenter, and David and Gwenda Plummer. John Lindell was hired to serve as pastor of the congregation in September 1991. It met at a small storefront "the blue building" in Springfield off Republic Road and National (which is now presently a Christian bookstore).

On April 8, 2019, the Church expanded its fourth campus, located an hour East jn Joplin for its Joplin campus.

Prior to the COVID pandemic, the church had over 19,000 members. According to a church census released in 2024, it claimed a weekly attendance of 11,554 people.

In April 2025, it left the Assemblies of God USA and became non-denominational while still adhering to AG doctrine and committing to support AG Missions.

== Community and international outreach ==
From 1997 to 2010, one of JRC's local events was the annual Fourth of July patriotic program, the I Love America! Celebration. In 2009, attendance for the 13th annual event, which was free to the public, reached approximately 120,000 people. Attendance in 2010 fell to 100,000.

== Controversies ==
On October 28, 2018, John Lindell stated during a sermon that yoga is a "form of Eastern mysticism that Christians should absolutely avoid".

Between December 5–6, 2020, James River Church hosted several large indoor gatherings to celebrate Christmas. Due to the recent surge of COVID-19 infections, the Christian County Health Department issued a notice that attendees should monitor their symptoms for 14 days after the event, and to contact a medical professional if any symptoms arise.

In March 2023, John Lindell publicized the story of his congregation's alleged restoration of a woman's amputated toes, saying that people watched them miraculously regrow during an hour of the church service under the power of faith. The church and the woman have refused to provide any evidence or respond to journalistic inquiry, and a website, showmethetoes.com, was spawned in offer to host any such evidence or eyewitness account.

=== Feud with Mark Driscoll ===
James River Church organizes annual "Stronger Men's Conferences". At the 2024 event, one of the opening acts was Alex Magala, a former go-go dancer) and an Orthodox Christian, who performed a sword swallowing act while climbing a pole. He has said the purpose of the act was to "inspire audiences to reach new heights of what’s possible in their lives". Later, planned speaker Mark Driscoll denounced this act, saying on stage that the "Jezebel spirit opened our event" and compared it to an ancient pagan ritual. John Lindell told Driscoll he was out of line and "You're done" and Driscoll gathered his things and left the stage.

Driscoll has previously used the term "Jezebel spirit" many times, including during a 2023 sermon series in which he applied the phrase to the Biden-Harris administration and claimed that passive men and domineering women were ruining society.

Although Lindell and Driscoll met later and reconciled, Driscoll continued attacking Magala and James River Church's leadership on social media. Driscoll also contacted Lindell's son and urged him to oust his father and brother and seize control of the church. Lindell described Driscoll's behavior as "demonic", a term Driscoll had also used to describe Magala. He also said that Driscoll's comments had led to a flood of death threats directed against Magala, James River Church, and the headquarters of the Assembly of God. Lindell said that Christians should have nothing to do with Driscoll unless he repents.
