= Lexington Mall =

- Location: Lexington, Kentucky, United States
- Coordinates: 38.015°N 84.460°W
- Opened: 1975
- Closed: 2005 (demolished summer 2011)
- Owner: Southland Christian Church
- Num. of stores: 48
- Num. of anchor tenants: 3
- Floor area: 428,000 square feet (39,800 m^{2})
- Floors: 1

Lexington Mall was a small shopping mall located in Lexington, Kentucky along US 25/US 421 (Richmond Road). The mall portion was built in 1975.

== Design ==
Designed as a competitor to Fayette Mall along US 27 (Nicholasville Road). It originally opened with a 2-story McAlpin's, Shoppers Choice Supermarket and a CSC discount store in 1971; however, the enclosed mall portion was not completed due to the bankruptcy of its primary developers.

== Early years ==
In 1975, the remainder of the mall was completed and opened with 48 stores. County Market replaced Shoppers Choice Supermarket in the 1980s, eventually expanding into the former CSC in 1984.

== Middle years ==
The mall was at 100% capacity and many stores were leading the nation in sales. The Karmelkorn Shoppe became the number one sales-leader in the nation for the month of December 1988 selling 16,250 pounds, or roughly eight tons, of popcorn; it was expected that it would be the number one chain again in December 1989 since same-store revenues had increased 30%. McAlpin's renovated their department store in 1993, freshening the interior with new tile, carpet and lighting fixtures, updating it with its first major update since it opened in 1971. They also opened an auxiliary store in the former Shopper's Choice/County Market after Heleringer's Furniture spent a short time in the building.

== Decline ==
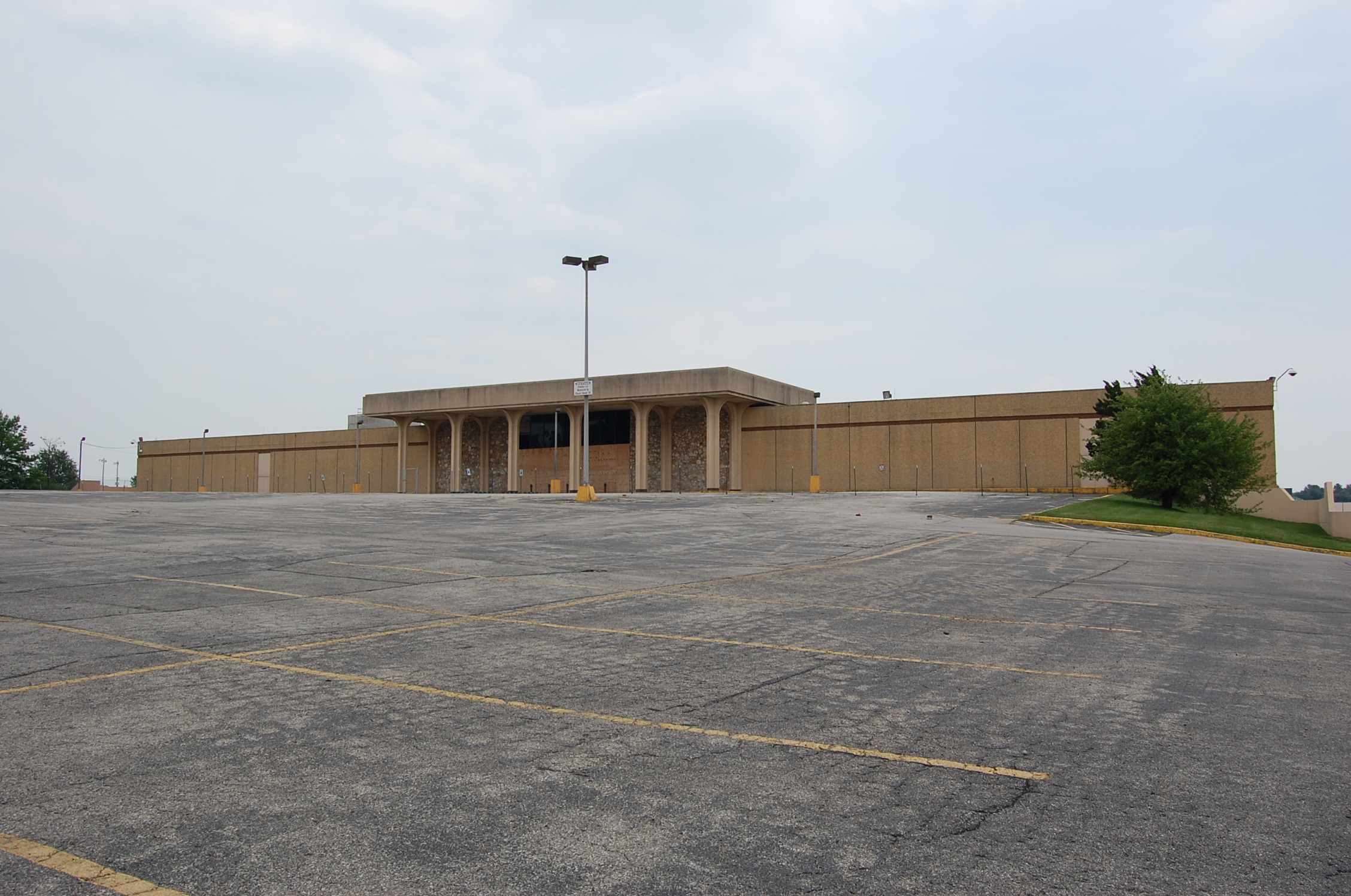
View of former McAlpin's/Dillard's.

The expansion of the Fayette Mall in 1993 with the addition of an entire wing and department store, began to erode Lexington Mall's customer base. The then-manager of the mall stated that the facility would be renovated by 1995, as it had not been renovated since its original opening; however, this was an un-kept promise.

County Market closed its operations at Lexington Mall late in 1995. Then in September 1996, another attempt to modernize came with plan to add an additional story to the main concourse; this too was never able to become reality.

Sony Theater closed its twin screen Lexington Mall operation in June 1997. Later that year, the mall suffered another hit when the Hamburg Pavilion opened at Hamburg Farms, taking more of the customer base away to the newer developments in Fayette County.

By 1999, the mall's future was in doubt with tenants leaving for newer shopping centers. The property became a victim of general deferred maintenance and neglect.

The mall's only remaining tenant, Dillard's left the mall in September 2005 to focus its operations at the Fayette Mall store.

== Closure and Demolition ==
The mall was once owned by Saul Centers Inc, a real-estate holding firm based in Bethesda, Maryland, offering no detailed plans for redevelopment or adaptive reuse. The local government once expressed interest in using eminent domain to purchase the dead mall and turn it into a small park, but took no action in doing so. In 2010, Lexington megachurch Southland Christian Church, whose main sanctuary is just outside Lexington in Jessamine County, purchased the mall from Saul Centers planning to renovate it into a third location for their services (the church had previously opened a satellite campus in Danville). In summer of 2011 Southland Christian began demolition on the mall property. Those involved in demolition have stated remains of the mall such as plywood and stone will be recycled to build the new building. Also it has been stated that the old Dillard's building will not be demolished but instead used for nurseries and classrooms. The new church opened in 2013.

== Unique Site ==
It was constructed on the former grounds of the Ellerslie estate, which dated back to 1787 and was constructed by Levi Todd, grandfather of Mary Todd Lincoln. In 1946, the house was demolished, having been purchased by the water company several years prior.
