= Green Acres Baptist Church =

Coordinates: 32.319°N 95.282°W

- Green Acres Baptist Church
- Location: 1607 Troup Hwy, Tyler, TX 75701
- Country: United States
- Denomination: Baptist
- Website: http://www.gabc.org

History
- Founded: 1955

Clergy
- Pastor: Dr. Michael Gossett

Green Acres Baptist Church is a Baptist church based in Tyler, Texas. It is affiliated with the Southern Baptist Convention. The church has an average weekend attendance of around 4,000. Dr. Michael Gossett is the Senior Pastor and took that role on Sunday, August 29, 2021.

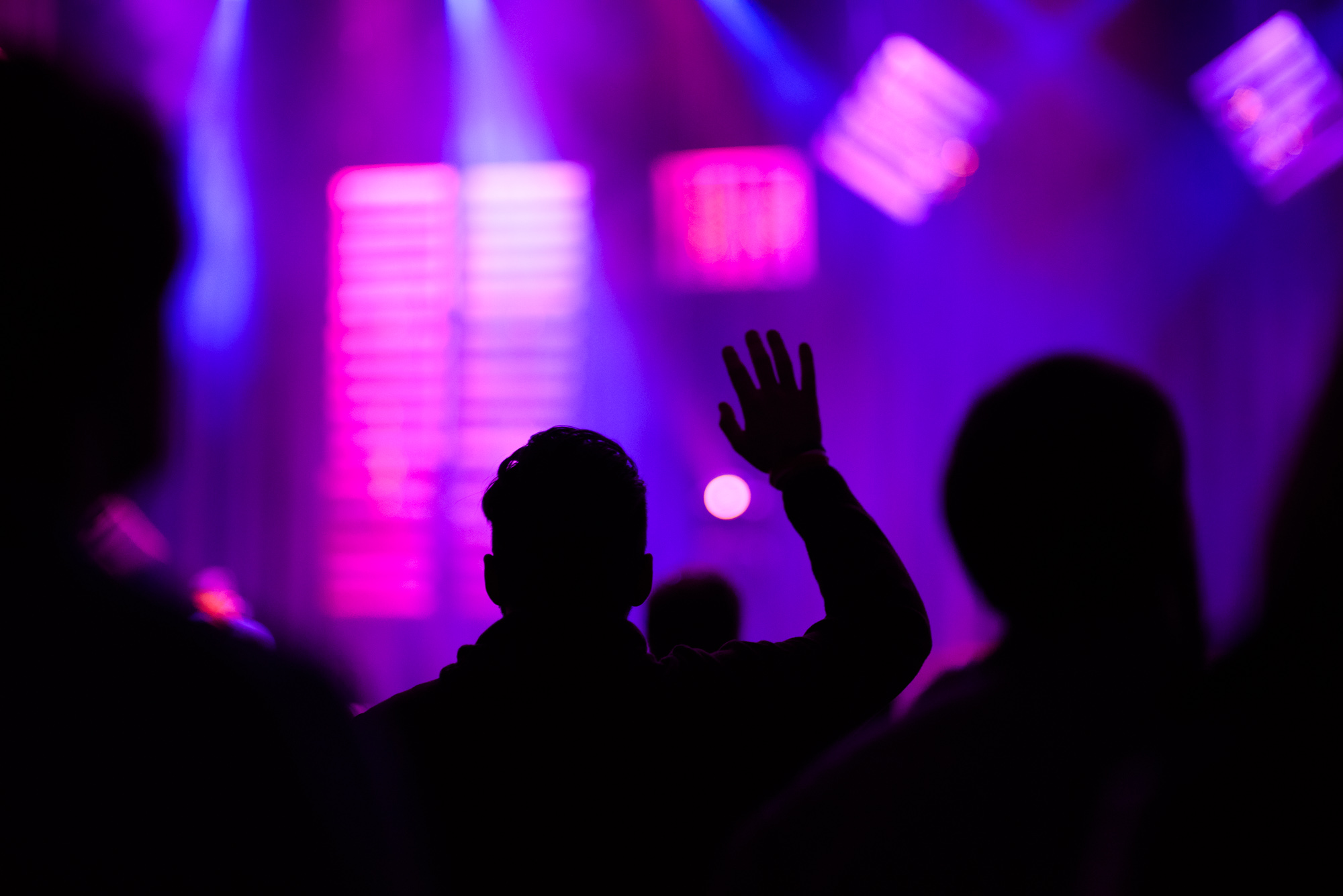
Green Acres Baptist Church

== History ==
The church was founded on May 1, 1955, with 297 charter members and the first pastor was Cecil Johnson. In 1962, the church had a membership of over 500. That same year, Lester Collins became the second pastor of Green Acres who served from 1962 to 1965. Paul Powell served as the next pastor for 17 years starting in 1972. In 1991, David Dykes became the Senior pastor. In 2013, the church had 14,000 members. On August 29, 2021, Dr. Michael Gossett officially became the Senior Pastor of Green Acres.

== Campuses ==
TYLER - 1607 Troup Highway Tyler, Texas 75701 | FLINT - 1010 County Road 137 in Flint, Texas 75762 | ESPAÑOL - Crosswalk Conference Center - 1607 Troup Highway Tyler, Texas 75701
