= Family Christian Center =

Coordinates: 41.542088°N 87.519076°W

- Family Christian Center
- Location: Munster, Indiana
- Country: United States
- Denomination: Evangelicalism
- Website: familychristiancenter.org

History
- Status: Active
- Founded: 1953

Family Christian Center, commonly abbreviated to FCC, is a megachurch located in Munster, Indiana. Today, Steve Munsey is the senior pastor at Family Christian Center.

== History ==
It was founded in the early 1950s by Bishop Frank Munsey and his wife, Ruth. The nondenominational church has 30,000 members, and even has a Starbucks in the lobby. Drama is used to supplement the preaching, such as by reenacting a battle scene to commemorate the beginning of the second Gulf War. The church also put on 3 yearly productions - Choices (formerly known as HearBreak Hotel/Hotel Hallelujah), Scrooge: The Musical, and Jesus of Nazareth. Other productions, such as Yellow Brick Road and White Throne Judgement, have been done also over the years. FCC is one of the fastest growing churches in the United States and listed as Outreach Magazine's 17th largest Church in the United States. Beginning with Saturday evening and continuing through Sunday morning, FCC holds four services each lasting 90 minutes. There is also a 6 p.m. service each Wednesday night. It now features a church in the back gymnasium for teenagers and young adults called Two52 Youth Culture. The church also features a radio station(88.3 FM Crosstower radio) and can be heard within 12 miles of the building in Munster. FCC has also branched off into the city of Chicago. City Church is run by Pastor Kent Munsey, Pastor Steve Munsey's son, and Kent's wife Alli. City Church holds three services on Sundays, two in the morning and one in the evening.

In November 2018, CBS News listed Family Christian Center as the 27th largest megachurch in the United States with about 15,540 weekly visitors.
