= Dante Gebel =

Argentine pastor and talk show host (born 1968)

Dante Miguel Gebel

Personal life
- Born: July 6, 1968 (age 58) Billinghurst, Argentina
- Spouse: Liliana Gebel
- Children: Brian Federico, Kevin Daniel, Jason Anthony, Megan Lilian
- Parents: Federico Gebel (father); Nelly Stokle de Gebel (mother)
- Occupation: Pastor, Writer, Artist

Religious life
- Religion: Pentecostal Evangelical Christian
- Denomination: Assemblies of God
- Church: River Church https://river-arena.org/

Dante Gebel (born July 6, 1968, in Billinghurst, Buenos Aires, Argentina) is an Argentine writer, pastor, talk show host and television personality, best known for hosting the Dante Night Show on TV Azteca and Dante’s Divine Night on Channel 9 (Argentina) which was later on El Trece (Argentina), for which he won a Martín Fierro award in 2023 as best television presenter at the ceremony that took place at the Manuel Artime theater in Miami.

== Early life ==
Dante Gebel was born into a working-class family. His mother was of English descent and his father of German origin and was a carpenter by profession.

He himself said in a sermon from the Crystal Cathedral on November 21, 2014 that when his mother was sick with cancer, Dante's older brother took his parents to an evangelical church service where a pastor prayed for his mother's healing. Soon after, Mrs. Gebel's illness disappeared spontaneously. His father Federico, who was an alcoholic, gave up alcohol and attended church with his family for the rest of his life.

He affirmed in an interview with Cristianos al dia channel that he has Asperger syndrome.

According to an article in the Argentine newspaper La Nación, his adolescence was spent at the German school Werner Von Siemens, where he studied electronics technology, but never completed his degree. Although he didn't finish high school, he does have an honorary doctorate. It was awarded to him by the California College of Theology in June 2019.

In his adolescence he began to serve in the church as a musician playing the drums, as a singer and accompanying evangelists in various campaigns. In 1990, he married Liliana. They said in a television interview on the Enlace TV program that same year they started a Christian radio program focused on young audiences at 1 in the morning. The program was very well received and from then on some churches began to invite him to preach at evangelistic events.

In 1996 he rented the José Amalfitani Stadium also known as Vélez Sarfield Stadium in Buenos Aires to carry out an evangelical event known as the Superclasico . It had the participation of the politician and singer Palito Ortega. Over 50,000 people attended the event. Subsequently, the 'Superclasicos' were held again until 2020 in different places such as Estadio Monumental and Plaza de la República.

== Pastor ==
From 2009 to 2012, he was pastor of the Hispanic church at Crystal Cathedral, Garden Grove, California The number of persons attending the cathedral's Hispanic Ministry was increased from 300 to 3,000 since Gebel took over in 2009. After that the congregation moved to the Anaheim Convention Center and was renamed Favorday Church

He currently pastors the Hispanic megachurch River Church in Anaheim, California.

One of Gebel's greatest sources of pride is the social work he carries out through the River Church Foundation, with projects in various parts of the world, which came to national attention during the 2025 floods in Bahía Blanca.

According to an article from April 9, 2026, in the Argentine newspaper La Nación, through this foundation, they have already equipped more than 2,500 homes and channeled between 47 and 48 million dollars in humanitarian aid. "We need to build houses, build hospitals, and we're always there," he says.

On May 14, 2019, Dante prayed in the celebration of the 71 years of independence of the state of Israel in Uganda. The event was led by Israel's deputy ambassador, David Eyal, and took place at the Kololo Pavilion in Kampala.

Gebel gave a speech and prayed for the President of El Salvador Nayib Bukele at his inauguration ceremony on June 1, 2019. Gebel also prayed and gave words of blessing on President Bukele's second inauguration on June 1, 2024.

He is the author of several books written in Spanish.

== Books ==
- Pasión de multitudes ISBN 9780829755039
- Las arenas del alma ISBN 9780829743579
- El código del campeón ISBN 9780829738292
- Marea Baja ISBN 9781418597580
- Low Tide (English) ISBN 1520097476
- Destinado al éxito ISBN 9780829756227
- El amor en los tiempos del Facebook ISBN 9788491390855

== Rumors of a presidential candidacy in Argentina ==
A response by Dante Gebel to a question from the media personality Mario Pergolini during an interview in October 2025 generated continuous news coverage in national media outlets and curiosity from the Argentine political scene. When Pergolini asked, "Would you go into politics? Would you like to be president?", Gebel replied that he didn't rule it out. Leaders from various Argentine political ideologies then began working on assembling a political movement called Consolidación Argentina (Argentine Consolidation) to plan and prepare a possible presidential candidacy for Dante Gebel. Among the political movements involved in this effort are center-right and right-wing Peronist sectors, pro-dialogue unions, founders of the party La Libertad Avanza (Freedom Advances) disillusioned with the direction of Javier Milei's government, business sectors concerned about the economic situation in 2026, and various organizations with Christian values throughout the country. Gebel has not yet announced a confirmation of his possible candidacy.
