= Worship Center =

Evangelical megachurch in Pennsylvania, US

Coordinates: 40.0825°N 76.2298°W

- Worship Center
- Address: 2384 New Holland Pike, Lancaster, Pennsylvania
- Denomination: Non-Denominational
- Website: worshipcenter.org

History
- Former name: The Worship Center
- Founder: Sam Smucker

Clergy
- Pastor: Matt Mylin

Worship Center (formerly The Worship Center) is an evangelical, nondenominational megachurch located in Lancaster County, Pennsylvania. The church is part of a broader movement of contemporary evangelical congregations that have emerged in the region alongside historically Anabaptist traditions.

== History ==
Worship Center was founded in 1977 when Sam Smucker and a small group of about 30 people began meeting for worship in a room at the former Sheraton Conestoga Hotel on Oregon Pike in Lancaster County, Pennsylvania. At the time, Smucker had recently completed a ministerial training program at Rhema Bible Training Center in Tulsa, Oklahoma, which accepted students without traditional academic credentials and prepared him for pastoral leadership. Within three years the congregation had grown sufficiently to rent space at the Lititz Recreation Center for its services.
