= Faith Promise Church =

Coordinates: 35.9620045°N 84.1684159°W

- Faith Promise Church
- Location: Knoxville, TN
- Country: United States
- Denomination: Non-Denominational
- Website: faithpromise.org

History
- Status: Active
- Founded: 1995
- Founder: Terry Dupont

Faith Promise Church is a non-denominational church with a central campus in Knoxville, Tennessee.

== History ==
The first worship service of Faith Promise Church was held on February 5, 1995, when 350 men, women, and children gathered to worship in the Garden Plaza Hotel in Oak Ridge, Tennessee. On July 1 of the following year, Faith Promise called Dr. Chris Stephens as its first senior pastor. In 1998, the church secured 33 acres (130,000 m^{2}) and began planning and development of its Pellissippi Campus. The first campus facility was completed and occupied in September 2000.

The church enjoyed continued growth throughout the next decade. By 2003, they had outgrown their existing facilities, and so Satellite-1 (changed to “Chapel” in 2019) was opened for overflow space, and Building 2 was completed. In 2005, Faith Promise Church was named for the first time as one of Outreach Magazine's 100 fastest growing churches in America. In 2007, a 350-seat balcony was added to the worship center to allow for continued growth. In April 2009, Faith Promise added their second campus—an Internet campus where people from all over the world could connect to online services each weekend. In August of the same year, they expanded the online campus to include American Sign Language for deaf attenders. Faith Promise launched their third campus (the second physical location) in Blount County, Tennessee, on October 3, 2010.

As of 2011, the church reported nearly 1,900 members and weekly attendance of more than 4,000 at its five Sunday services. It employed twelve ministers and had an annual operating budget of $4.8 million.

As of 2014, the church had expanded to six sites. In addition to the Pellissippi main campus in West Knoxville, the online ministry and the Blount County site, campuses had been created in North Knoxville, Campbell County and Anderson County. An affiliate church has also been established in Costa Rica. Average weekly attendance encompassing all sites has grown to over 5,000. The 2014 edition of Outreach Magazine listed Faith Promise Church as the 22nd fastest growing church in America. In 2017 Faith Promise launched a Farragut campus in Farragut High School with Zac Stephens serving as the campus pastor but was eventually succeeded by Daniel Warren in 2019.

Despite a year of separation, shutdown, and quarantine, two new essential campuses launched in 2020 to reach people who would otherwise be out of reach: Promesa de Fe, Knoxville, to reach people in their own language and a campus in Bristol, TN.

== Affiliation ==
Faith Promise Church is an autonomous and self-governing group. They are affiliated with the Southern Baptist Convention only for the purpose of missions and are more accurately defined as a nondenominational church. https://churches.sbc.net/church/faith-promise-church-pellissippi-campus/ .
