= Flatirons Community Church =

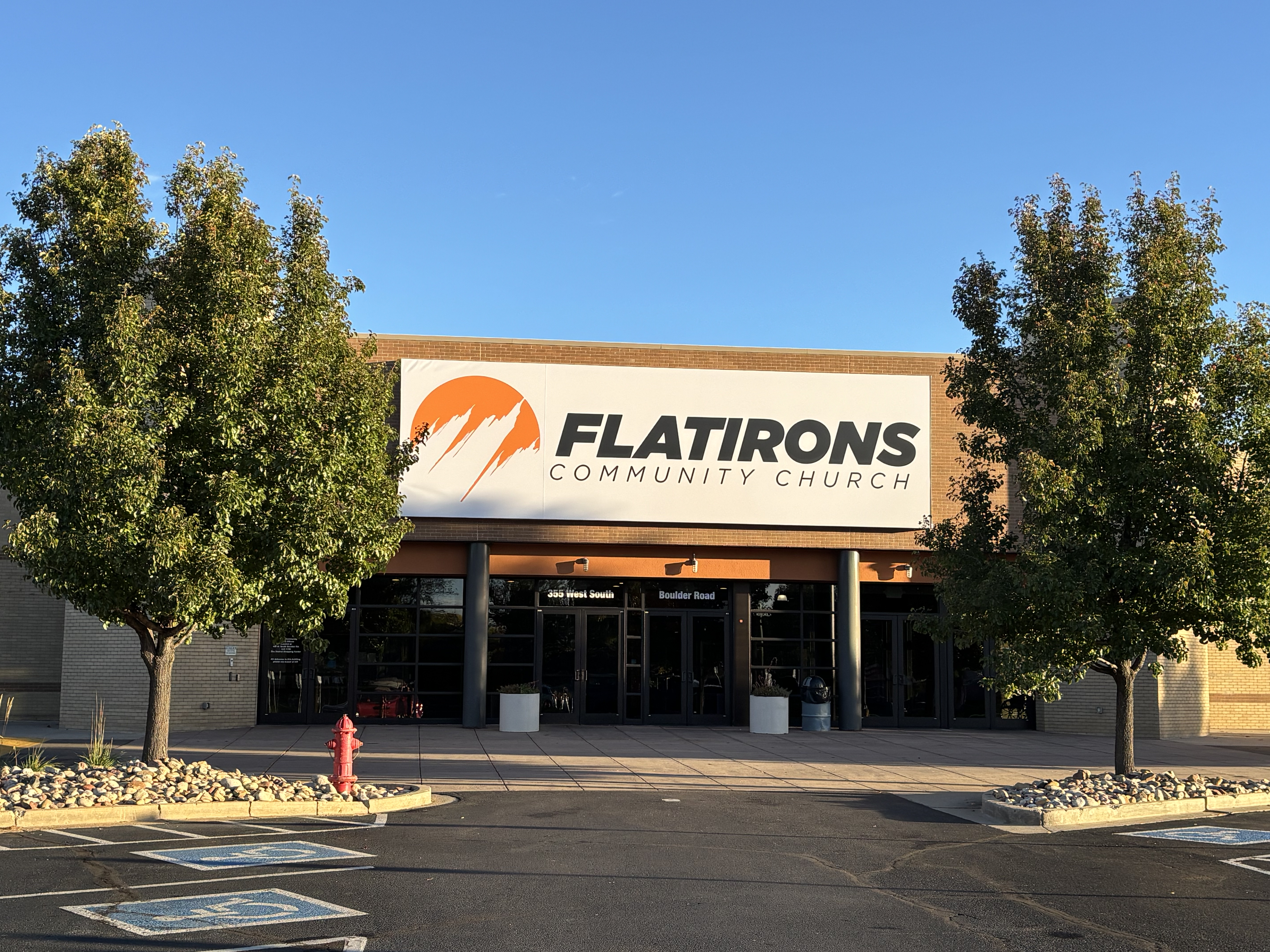
- Flatirons Community Church west entrance on South Boulder Road in Lafayette, Colorado.

- Location in Colorado Location in United States
- 39.9867°N 105.0937°W
- Location: Lafayette, Colorado
- Country: United States
- Denomination: Non-denominational
- Website: flatironschurch.com

History
- Founded: 1997

Clergy
- Pastor: Jess Deyoung (Executive Lead Pastor)

Flatirons Community Church is a large non-denominational evangelical megachurch based in Lafayette, Colorado, roughly 10 miles east of Boulder. Founded in the mid-1990s, it operates multiple campuses in the Denver–Boulder area and an online service. Flatirons has been included in national listings of large U.S. churches published by Outreach magazine and CBS News.

== History ==
Flatirons Community Church traces its origins to the mid-1990s. The congregation initially met under different names in the Boulder area before adopting the name Flatirons Community Church by the late 1990s. By the early 2000s the congregation had grown substantially: reporting in 2002 placed weekly attendance at about 1,700, and by the mid-2000s attendance had increased to several thousand.

In the late 2000s the church sought to expand its Lafayette facilities. The Lafayette City Council approved a site plan in November 2008, but the church revised plans in late 2009 after local residents and business owners raised concerns about traffic and building scale.

Rather than building new ground-up facilities at the original site, the church ultimately renovated and combined two large vacant retail buildings in Lafayette to create a consolidated campus. The adaptive-reuse project converted former big-box grocery/retail space into a worship and education campus totaling roughly 160,000 sq ft; the main auditorium has been reported with capacity in the multiple-thousands (approximately 4,000 seats).

Following the development of the Lafayette broadcast campus, Flatirons expanded to additional in-person locations and an online campus. The Denver campus launched in September 2015 out of the Paramount Theatre and moved to a permanent site south of downtown in December 2016; the Longmont campus opened in 2018.

Estimates of weekly attendance vary by source and year. Independent media reporting and national lists have placed Flatirons among the larger U.S. congregations: for example, Westword reported weekly attendance figures around 13,000 in 2013, and CBS News included Flatirons in its 2018 list of the country's biggest megachurches (reported figure: 15,495). Outreach (Outreach100) has also listed Flatirons in its national rankings. Because attendance figures change over time and are reported differently by different organizations, figures below are attributed to their sources.

Media coverage has noted its use of contemporary worship music, multi-campus organization, and community discussions over land use and traffic impact.

=== Facilities ===
The Lafayette campus is an adaptive reuse of two large retail buildings and is reported to total roughly 160,000–168,000 sq ft. According to vendor and architectural sources, the main auditorium seats about 4,300, with additional lobby overflow capacity.

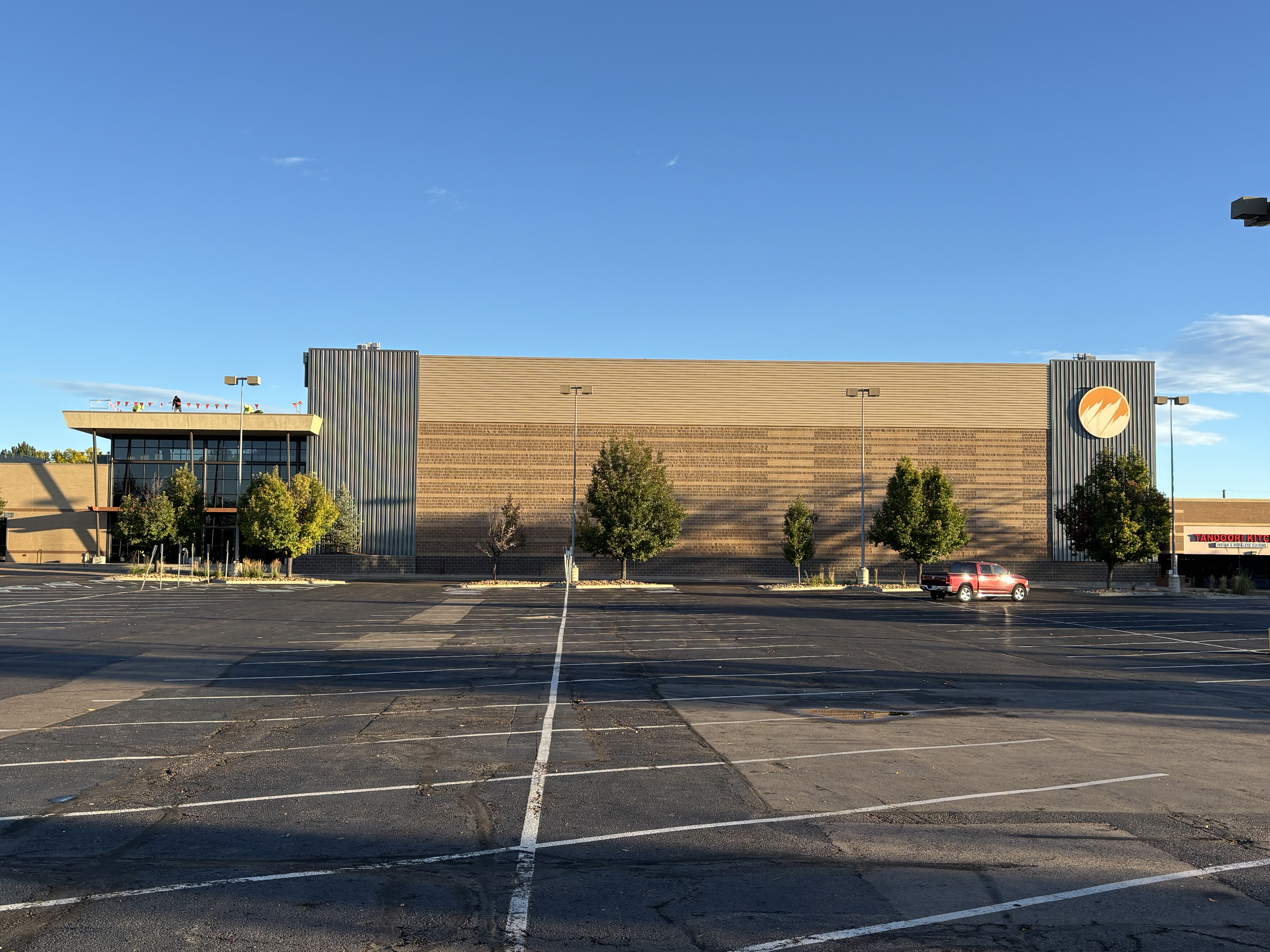
East-facing view of Flatirons Community Church on South Boulder Road in Lafayette, Colorado, showing the glass lobby at left, brick and metal-clad facade with circular orange logo, and expansive parking lot.

== Leadership ==
The senior/lead pastor is Jim Burgen.

== Campuses and affiliated organizations ==
Flatirons operates multiple in-person campuses in the Denver-Boulder metro area (Lafayette, Denver, Aurora, Longmont, West/Genesee) and an online campus. The church is affiliated with Flatirons Academy, an accredited K-12 Christian school in Westminster.

== Reception and controversies ==
During the church’s proposed expansion in Lafayette in 2008–2009, community groups and nearby business owners raised concerns about increased traffic, building scale, and disruption to residential neighborhoods. Some critics argued that the existing road infrastructure would not support the increased vehicle flow, and that the size of the proposed auditorium and parking layout would adversely affect adjacent neighborhoods.

The church revised its original building plans following public feedback, and eventually opted for an adaptive reuse of existing retail buildings rather than a ground-up expansion at the original site.

Beyond infrastructure objections, there do not appear in available sources to be major sustained controversies (e.g. theological, legal) in the public record.
