= David O. Dykes =

American Baptist minister (1953–2025)

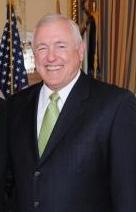
- Born: January 16, 1953
- Died: July 2, 2025 (aged 72)
- Education: Samford University
- Occupation: Clergyman
- Spouse: Cynthia "Cindy" Dykes
- Children: Two daughters
- Religion: Southern Baptist
- Ordained: Southern Baptist Theological Seminary
- Congregations served: Green Acres Baptist Church of Tyler, Texas
- Title: Pastor Emeritus
- Website: www.gabc.org

David O. Dykes (January 16, 1953 – July 2, 2025) was an American Baptist minister who was Pastor Emeritus and onetime Senior Pastor of Green Acres Baptist Church in Tyler, Texas. He was also the author of several Christian books. Under his leadership Green Acres became "one of the leading churches in America," according to president of the SBC Executive Committee Morris Chapman.

Dykes opened the Texas Legislature with prayer and opened the US House with prayer in 2008.

Dykes was honored by the Southern Baptist Convention Executive Committee with its highest honor, the M.E. Dodd Award, for a lifetime of work.

== Early life and education ==
Dykes was raised in South Alabama, where he began preaching at age 17. He received a B.A. from Samford University in Birmingham, Alabama in 1975. Dykes received his Master of Divinity degree from the Southern Baptist Theological Seminary in Louisville, Kentucky. He also earned his Doctor of Ministry degree with emphasis on evangelism and church growth from the Southern Baptist Theological Seminary. He received post-doctoral training at Cambridge University in Cambridge, England.

== Ministry ==
Dykes began preaching in 1970. He pastored churches in Alabama before going to Green Acres Baptist Church in 1991.

He personally led mission teams to 10 countries, including trips to Ukraine, Mexico, Belize, Brazil, and Argentina. He trained church leaders in the US and around the world each year on biblical principles of leadership. Dykes led over twenty educational tours to the Holy Land and Israel.

He was an enthusiastic supporter of the Cooperative Program.

In 2009, he hosted the Hope For 100 "If You Were Mine" conference with the goal of encouraging people to adopt and foster care. He was also a supporter of Acquire the Fire's Relentless Pursuit.

In February 2021 Dykes announced his pending retirement from the pulpit, to take place at the end of August, in order to allow a smooth transition to whoever would be the new pastor, something which he mentioned hadn't happened when he became pastor. Michael Gossett became Senior Pastor on August 29, 2021.

== Politics ==
Dykes participated in Pulpit Freedom Sunday, voicing support for Mitt Romney. Dykes and Congressman Gohmert invited Joel Rosenberg to discuss his book, Damascus Count Down, about the endtimes and the possibility of a foreign-policy mistake by a president leading to war.

He endorsed Tom Leppert for Republican primary in the 2012 United States Senate election in Texas.

== Death ==
Dykes died on July 2, 2025, at the age of 72.

== Writings ==
Dykes published articles in Moody Monthly, Church Administration, and Guideposts. He was the author of eleven books.

=== Books ===
- Handling Life's Disappointments (1993)
- Do Angels Really Exist?: Separating Fact from Fantasy (1996)
- Ten Requirements for American's Survival (2004)
- Character Out of Chaos: Daring to Be a Daniel in Today's World (2005)
- Angels Really Do Exist (2005)
- Finding Peace in Your Pain (2008)
- No, That's Not in the Bible (2009)
- Revelation: God's Final Word (2010)
- Jesus Storyteller: Timeless Truths from His Parables (2011)
- Hope When You Need It Most (2012)
