= Southeast Christian Church =

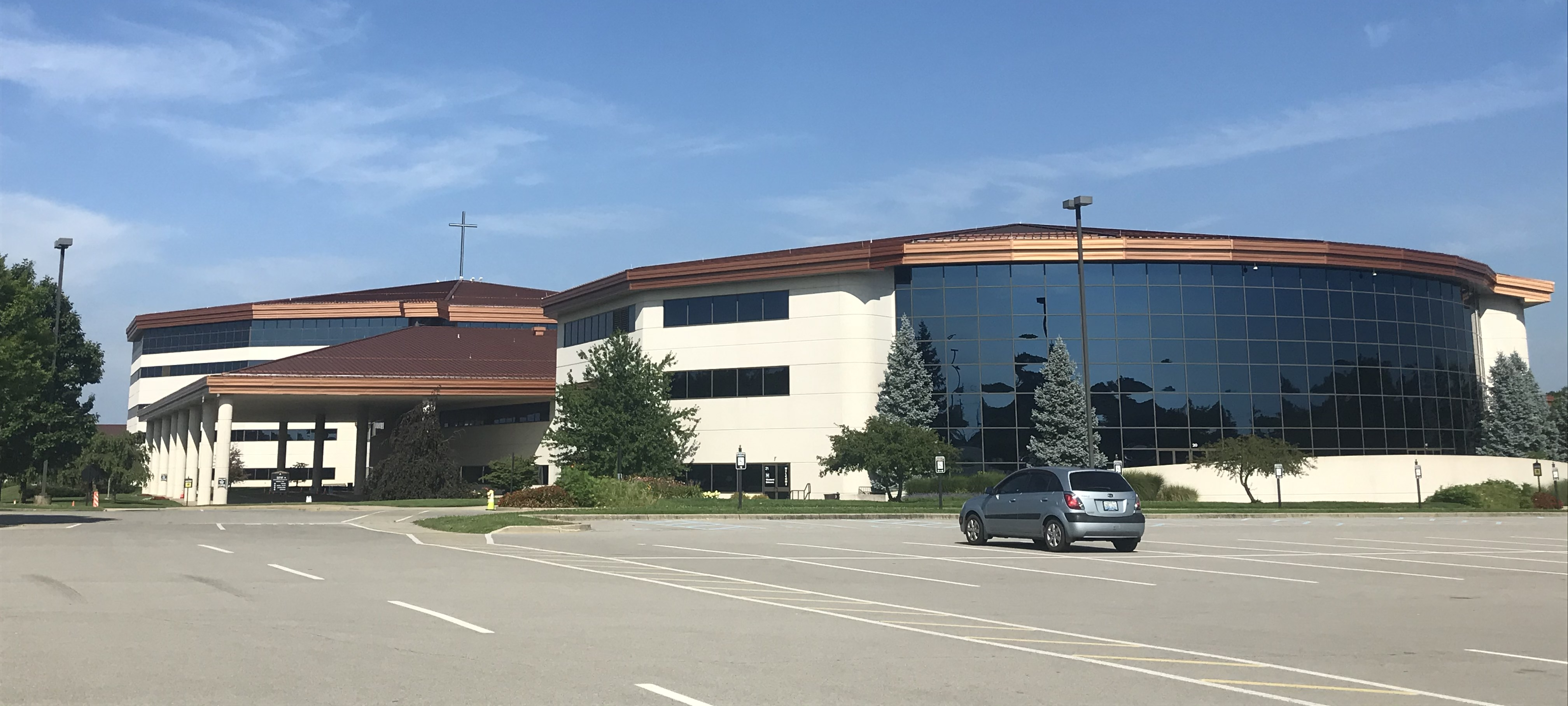
- Southeast Christian (Blankenbaker Campus) in July 2020
- Southeast Christian Church
- Location: Louisville, Kentucky
- Country: United States
- Denomination: Independent Christian Churches and Churches of Christ
- Website: www.southeastchristian.org

History
- Founded: July 1, 1962
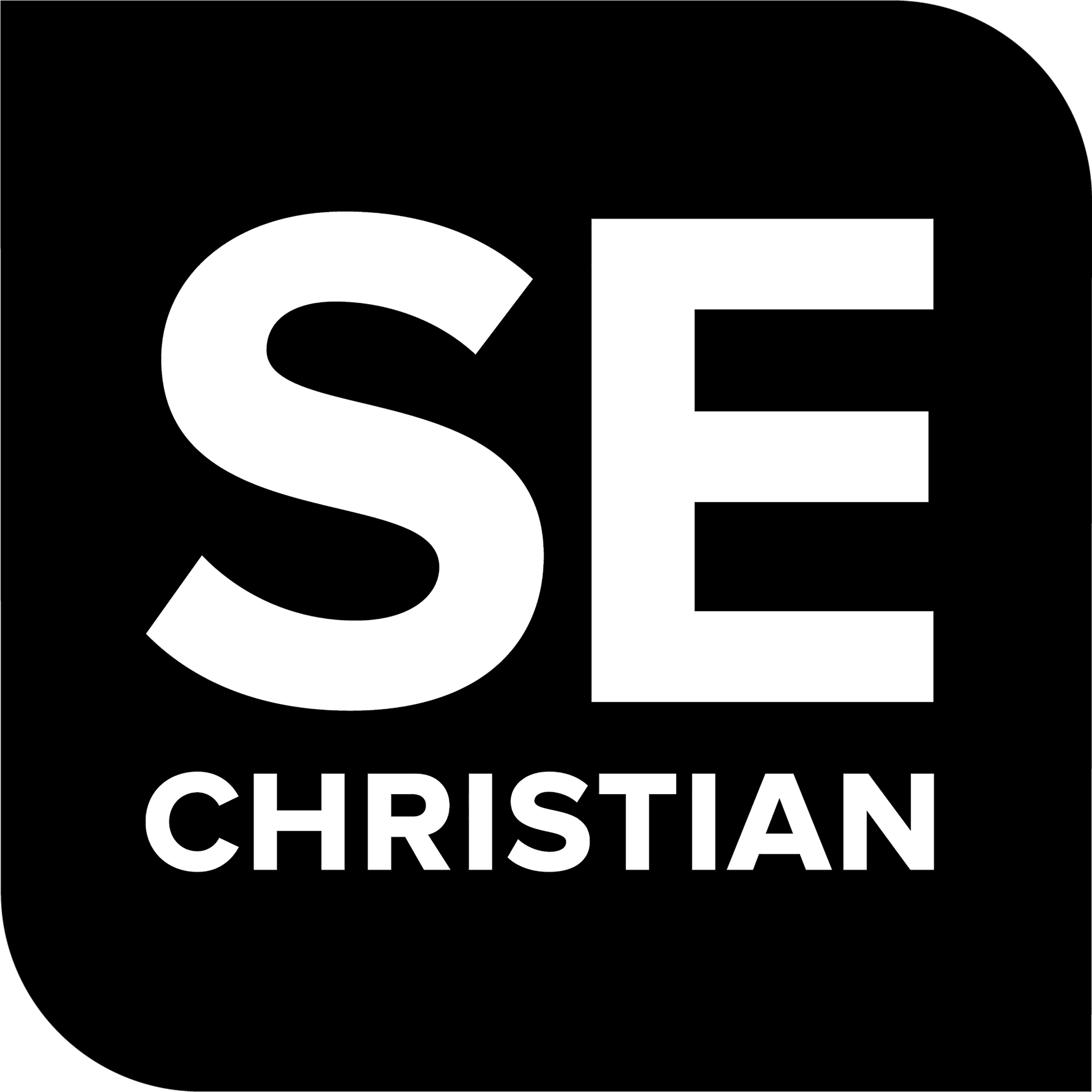

Southeast Christian Church is an Evangelical multi-site megachurch based in Louisville, Kentucky. It is a part of the Restoration Movement, and its denomination Independent Christian Churches and Churches of Christ. As of 2024, it is the eleventh-largest church in the United States by average weekend attendance.

Kyle Idleman is the current senior pastor and a bestselling author. Idleman has been on the Southeast staff since 2002.

== History ==
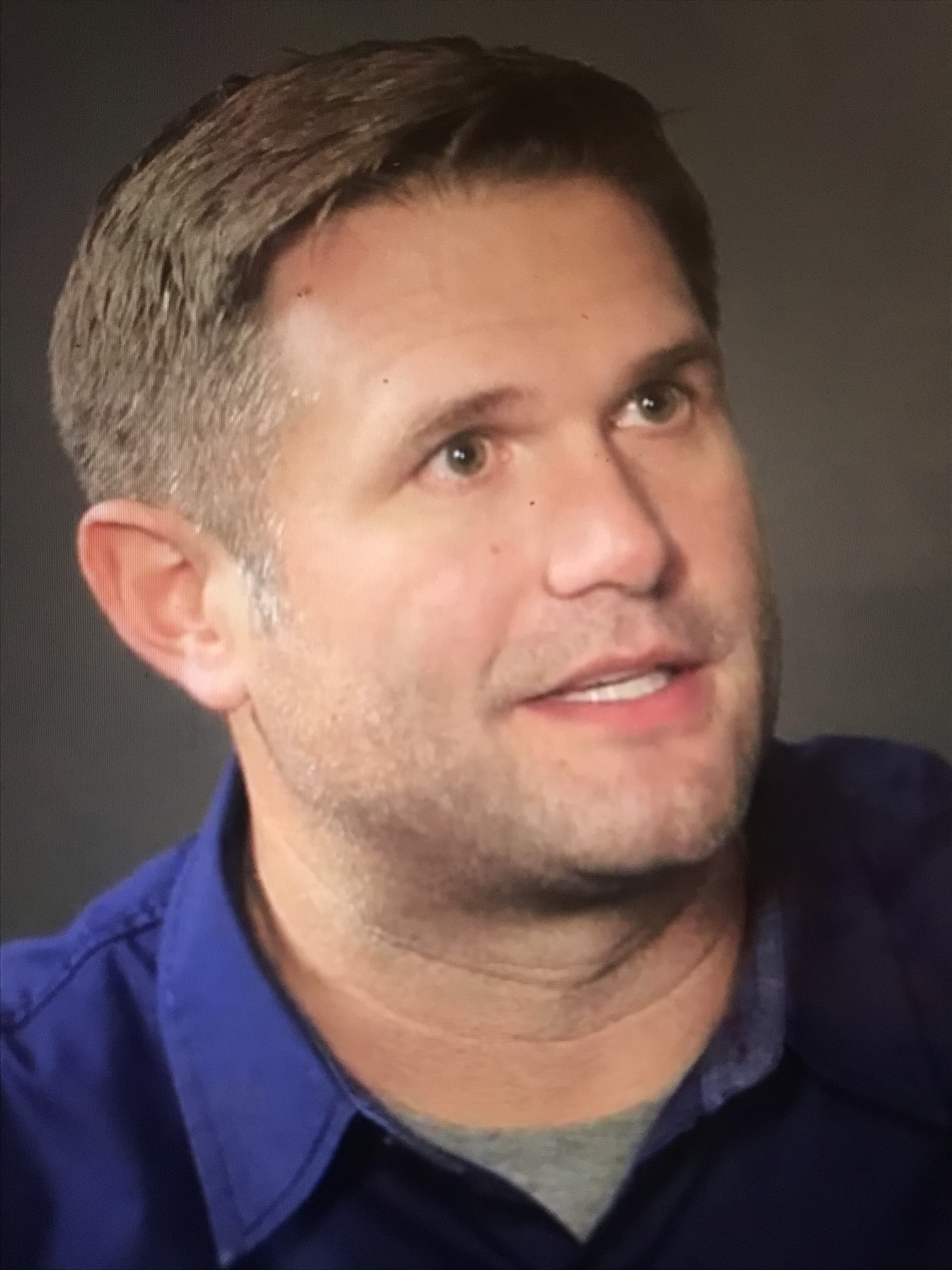
Kyle Idleman, the church's leader since 2019

The church was established on July 1, 1962, as 53 members of South Louisville Christian Church, ministered by Olin Hay, started a new church in the Hikes Point area called 'Southeast Christian Church'. Four years later, in 1966, Hay's brother-in-law, Butch Dabney, a founding elder, hired Bob Russell their first senior minister. Russell retired in 2006 after 40 years of service. He was succeeded as senior minister by Dave Stone, the longtime preaching associate at Southeast. John Schnatter once donated an unspecified amount of money for a new sanctuary. The church is commonly known as "Six Flags over Jesus" to local residents, a satirical reference to the large size of the church building.

In February 2007, Southeast Christian officially released an announcement that it would establish a satellite church in Clark County, Indiana. With the establishment of a second location, Southeast became a multi-site church. The breaking of the ground, by I-65 Exit 4 in Jeffersonville, Indiana, took place on August 12, 2007, and the church officially opened on April 12, 2009. On February 8, 2009, the church announced the plans for its third location. The Oldham County Campus, in Crestwood, Kentucky, held its first service in January 2011. In 2009, Southeast also opened up a new youth building called "The Block". On the weekend of June 30/July 1, 2012, the church announced that it would develop a fourth campus in southwest Jefferson County, near Dixie Highway (US 31W) and adjacent to the southwestern campus of Christian Academy of Louisville. This site was originally expected to open in fall 2013, but groundbreaking was delayed until February 2013; the new campus opened in time for Easter 2014. The next satellite campus was found in an old movie theatre in LaGrange, Kentucky in January 2017, making this the 5th campus to launch. In 2017, a satellite campus opened in Elizabethtown, Kentucky. The church also opened a campus in Prospect, Kentucky in 2019.

In November 2018, CBS News listed Southeast Christian Church as the 12th largest megachurch in the United States with about 21,764 weekly visitors.

In September 2019, the church announced a campus in Shelby County, Kentucky would be built, and in January 2020, the church announced a campus in Bullitt County, Kentucky would be built. In May 2021, the South Louisville campus launched.

According to a church census released in 2023, it claimed a weekly attendance of 25,917 people and 14 campuses in different cities.

== See also ==
- Religion in Louisville, Kentucky
