= Outreach (magazine) =

Evangelical Christian magazine

- Frequency: Bimonthly
- First issue: January 2002
- Company: Outreach, Inc.
- Country: United States
- Based in: Colorado Springs, Colorado
- Language: English
- Website: outreachmagazine.com

Outreach is an evangelical Christian magazine based in Colorado Springs, Colorado. It focuses on the activities of growing churches and is non-denominational. It is a periodical from the organization Outreach, Inc., founded in 1996 by Scott Evans and provides community outreach products.

Each October, Outreach lists the 100 largest and the 100 fastest growing churches in America.

== History ==
The magazine was started in January 2002.

Outreach Media, Inc. announced that it would be moving its church communications, publishing and media company to Colorado Springs in June 2012, and would be hiring for about 70 positions.

Gloo Holdings, Inc. fully acquired Outreach Media, Inc. on January 2, 2024, for $52,990,000.
