= Multi-site church =

Church with multiple locations

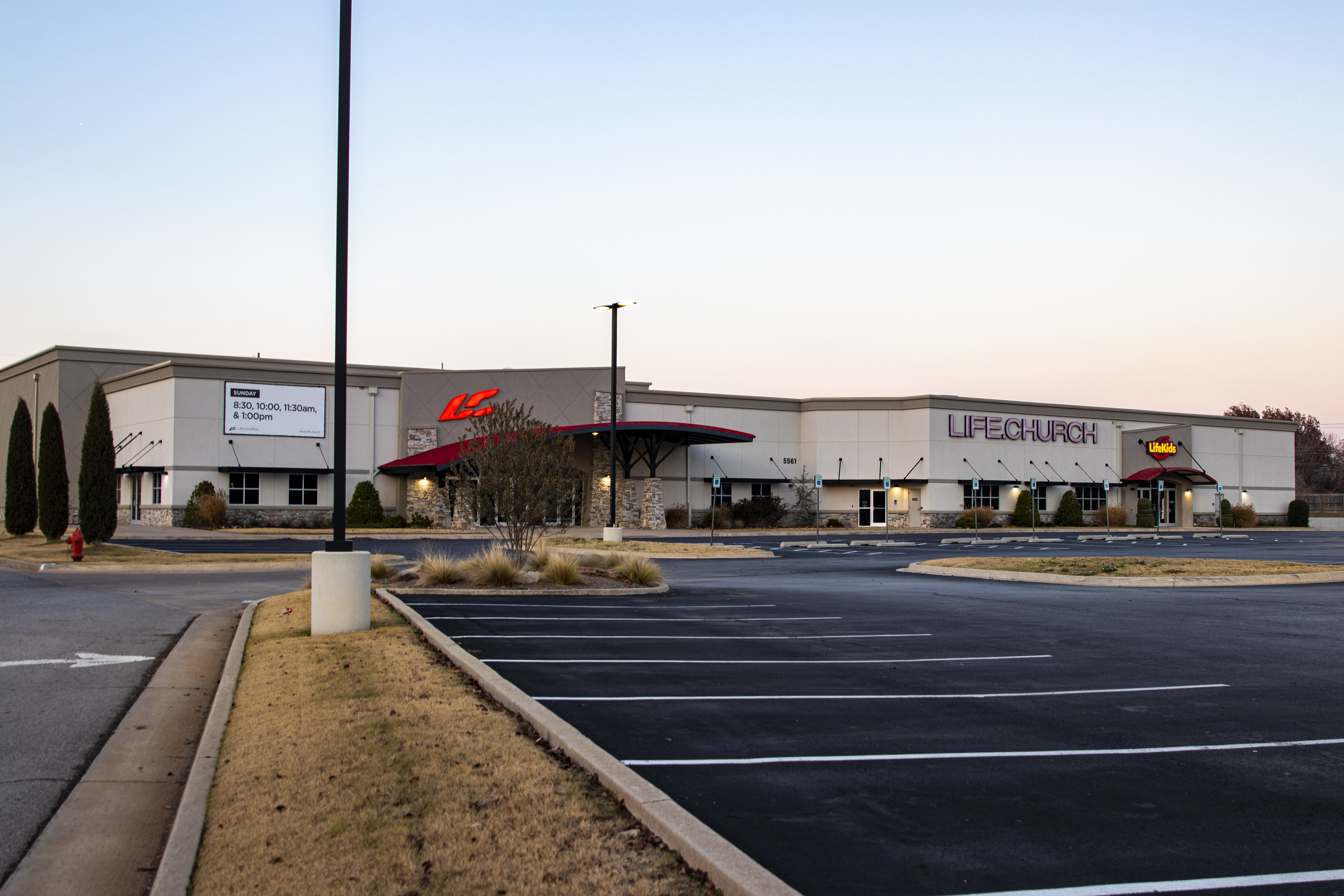
The Oklahoma-based Life.Church has 46 locations across 12 U.S. states

A multi-site church is a specific church congregation which holds services at multiple geographical locations, either within a specific metropolitan area or, increasingly, several such areas.

== Characteristic ==
A multisite church is a local church that has other campuses in various locations within the same city or in different cities. Within the multi-site approach, both the primary location (usually the one with the largest physical attendance) and the offsite locations will commonly have their own music worship and announcements pertaining to that congregation. The sermon is mostly given by an on-site pastor, while in some churches it is broadcast via video from the main location. The different campuses share physical and financial resources.

== History ==
The first church to become multi-site was Highland Park Baptist Church in Chattanooga, Tennessee, in 1942. In 1990, there were 10 multisite churches the United States. In 2014, there were 8,000 multisite churches. According to a 2015 Leadership Network study, 37% of multi-site church campuses were autonomous churches that merged with another church. Some multi-site churches have also established campuses in prisons. A study by the Hartford Institute for Religion Research, Evangelical Council for Financial Accountability, and Leadership Network published in 2020 found that 70% of American megachurches had a multi-site network.

== Criticism ==
American Professor Eddie Gibbs on Church Growth at Fuller Theological Seminary, criticized the model of the video sermon broadcast in some multi-site churches for the lack of relationship between the pastor teacher and the faithful at each site, which would lead to messages less adapted to the reality of each campus.

== See also ==
- Bishopric
- Megachurch
- Satellite campus
- List of megachurches in the United States
