= Jody Berland =

Canadian Scholar

Jody Berland is a Canadian scholar, full professor emerita and senior scholar at York University. She was awarded the Gertrude J. Robinson Book Prize by the Canadian Communication Association.

She is the Principal Investigator of the SSHRC-funded multidisciplinary research project Digital Animalities: Media Representations of Nonhuman Life in the Age of Risk.

Her scholarship is known for its focus on how media technologies, environmental issues, and cultural phenomena interact and how they shape and mediate human and nonhuman experiences. Her work explores topics, including media theory, music and technology, feminism, human- animal relations, digital media, weather and climate, and sound studies.

== Early life and education ==
Berland was born in Iowa City and moved to Regina, Canada with her family when she was twelve. Her academic journey began with a double BA in English and Sociology and an MA in Special Arrangements (Interdisciplinary Studies) from Simon Fraser University in Vancouver. She earned her PhD in Social and Political Thought from York University.

== Career and research ==
After teaching at Trent University and Carleton University she moved to the Department of Humanities at Atkinson College, York University, and later the Department of Humanities, Faculty of Arts, where she taught and conducted research for several decades. In addition to her academic role, she has been actively involved in faculty governance and activism. She served on the board of the Canadian Association of Learned Journals for some years. She was a co-founder of the YUFA Climate Emergency Committee, advocating for the inclusion of climate change education within academic curriculum.

She served as co-founder and Editor of TOPIA: Canadian Journal of Cultural Studies from 1998 to 2015.

Berland's research interests have evolved to address pressing global issues, such as climate change, ecological risk, and posthumanism. Her book, Virtual Menageries: Animals as Mediators in Network Cultures, examines the role of animals as active mediators in the dissemination of colonial power relations and contemporary digital networks.

Her articles have appeared in journals such as the Canadian Journal of Communications, Cultural Studies, Humanimalia, Global South and New Formation.

== Selected bibliography ==
=== Monographs ===
- Berland, Jody (2019). Virtual Menageries. The MIT Press. doi:10.7551/mitpress/11567.001.0001. ISBN 978-0-262-35200-0.
- Berland, Jody (2009). North of Empire. Duke University Press. doi:10.1215/9780822388661. ISBN 978-0-8223-4288-5.

=== Books ===
- Berland, Jody (2015). Hlynsky, David (ed.). Window-shopping through the Iron Curtain. London: Thames & Hudson. ISBN 978-0-500-25211-6.
- <Berland, Jody; Fitzpatrick, Blake, eds. (2010). Cultures of militarization. Waterloo, Ontario: Wilfred Laurier University Press Cape Breton University Press. ISBN 978-1-897009-56-7. OCLC 669242342.
- Berland, Jody; Straw, Will; Tomas, David, eds. (1996). Theory rules: art as theory, theory and art. Toronto Buffalo: YYZ Books and University of Toronto Press. ISBN 978-0-8020-7657-1.
- Berland, Jody; Hornstein, Shelley, eds. (2000-03-03). Capital Culture. McGill-Queen's University Press. doi:10.1515/9780773567177. ISBN 978-0-7735-6717-7.

=== Book chapters ===
- Berland, Jody (2024-12-31), "24 Havoc Ornithologies", The Edinburgh Companion to Literature and Sound Studies, Edinburgh University Press, pp. 382–405, doi:10.1515/9781399502313-026, ISBN 978-1-3995-0231-3
- Berland, Jody (2022). Gennaro, Steve; Miller, Blair (eds.). Young people and social media: contemporary children's digital culture. Critical perspectives on social science. Wilmington (Del.): Vernon press. ISBN 978-1-64889-383-4.
- Berland, Jody (2008). "CAT AND MOUSE". Cultural Studies. 22 (3–4): 431–454. doi:10.1080/09502380802012559. ISSN 0950-2386.
- Berland, Jody (2003). "Radio Space and Industrial Time: The Case of Music Formats". pp. 230–239. doi:10.1002/9780470690079.ch18. ISBN 978-0-631-22299-6. ;
- Berland, Jody (1996-12-31), "Bodies of Theory, Bodies of Pain: Some Silences", Theory Rules, University of Toronto Press, pp. 133–156, doi:10.3138/9781442664647-008, ISBN 978-1-4426-6464-7

=== Journal articles ===
- Berland, Jody (1988). "Locating listening: Technological space, popular music, Canadian mediations". Cultural Studies. 2 (3): 343–358. doi:10.1080/09502388800490221. ISSN 0950-2386.
- Berland, Jody (1995-09-01). "Marginal Notes on Cultural Studies in Canada". University of Toronto Quarterly. 64 (4): 514–525. doi:10.3138/utq.64.4.514. ISSN 0042-0247.
- Berland, Jody (1994). "On reading 'The weather'". Cultural Studies. 8 (1): 99–114. doi:10.1080/09502389400490061. ISSN 0950-2386.
- Berland, Jody (2000-03-03), "Nationalism and the Modernist Legacy: Dialogues with Innis", Capital Culture, McGill-Queen's University Press, pp. 14–38, doi:10.1515/9780773567177-005, ISBN 978-0-7735-6717-7
- Berland, Jody (2009). "The elephant in the classroom". International Journal of Inclusive Education. 13 (7): 699–711. doi:10.1080/13603110903045996. ISSN 1360-3116.
- Berland, Jody (2005). "Walkerton: The Memory of Matter". TOPIA: Canadian Journal of Cultural Studies. 14: 93–108. doi:10.3138/topia.14.93. ISSN 1206-0143.
- Berland, Jody (2019-12-08). "McLuhan and Posthumanism: Extending the Techno-Animal Embrace". Canadian Journal of Communication. 44 (4). doi:10.22230/cjc.2019v44n4a3725. ISSN 1499-6642.
- Berland, Jody (2017-09-22). "Attending the Giraffe". Humanimalia. 9 (1): 22–45. doi:10.52537/humanimalia.9612. ISSN 2151-8645.
