= Mike Beard (politician) =

American politician

Member of the Scott County Board of Commissioners from the 3rd District
- Incumbent
- Assumed office January 1, 2015

Member of the Minnesota House of Representatives from the 55A district 35A (2003–2013)
- In office January 7, 2003 – January 5, 2015
- Preceded by: Ken Wolf
- Succeeded by: Bob Loonan

Personal details
- Born: July 22, 1953 (age 73) Clearfield, Pennsylvania
- Party: Republican Party of Minnesota
- Education: Bethany College of Missions
- Occupation: businessman, publisher, legislator

Michael Beard (born July 22, 1953) is a Minnesota politician and former member of the Minnesota House of Representatives, who retired in 2014. A member of the Republican Party of Minnesota, he represented District 55A, which includes portions of Scott County in the southwestern part of the Twin Cities metropolitan area. Communities in the district include Shakopee, Jackson Township, and Louisville Township. He is also a local businessman and newspaper publisher. He is now also co-chair of a coal energy advocacy group, Coalition for a Secure Energy Future and serves as Scott County Commissioner, District 3.

== Early life, education, and career ==
Beard graduated from Bethany College of Missions in Bloomington, earning his BA in Bible Missions. He later attended entrepreneurial classes at the University of St. Thomas in Saint Paul. He was the owner and operator of Macalester Park Public Company from 1987 to 1995, and has been publisher of the Minnesota Christian Chronicle newspaper since 1994. He was a member of the Shakopee City Council from 1991 to 1995, and was a member of the Minnesota Regional Transit Board from 1993 to 1995.

== Minnesota House of Representatives ==
Beard was first elected in 2002, and was re-elected every two years since then until retiring in 2014.

On May 21, 2011, he joined the House Republican Majority in voting for a constitutional amendment to define marriage as between a man and woman. On May 7, 2012, he voted in favor of controversial House File 1485, the bill authorizing construction of a new Vikings Stadium.

Beard announced on March 18, 2014 that he would not seek re-election.
