= Cultural icon =

Something connected to cultural identity

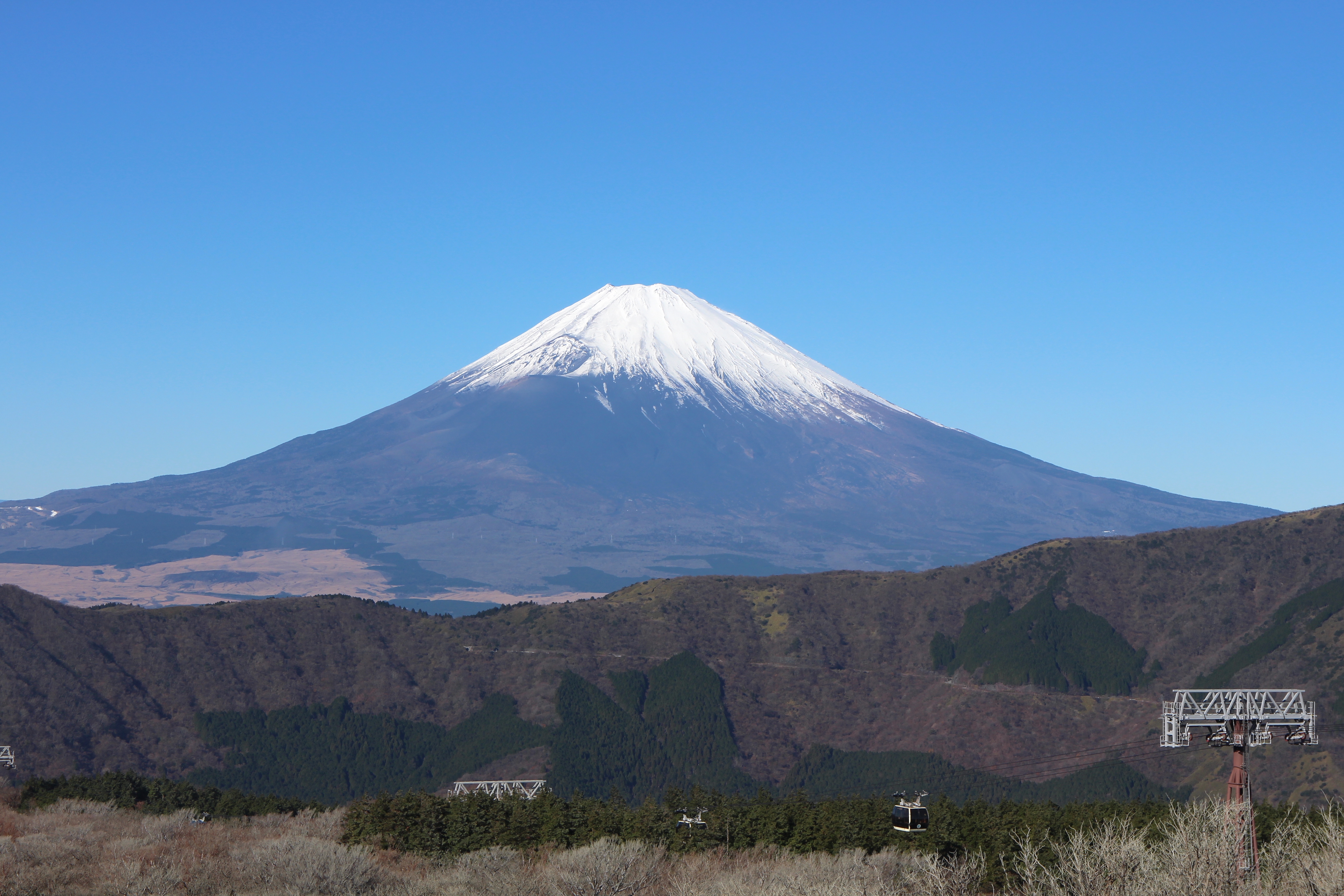
Mount Fuji is commonly used as a cultural icon of Japan.

A cultural icon is a person or an artifact that is identified by members of a culture as representative of that culture. The process of identification is subjective, and "icons" are judged by the extent to which they can be seen as an authentic symbol of that culture. When individuals perceive a cultural icon, they relate it to their general perceptions of the cultural identity represented. Cultural icons can also be identified as an authentic representation of the practices of one culture by another.

In popular culture and elsewhere, the term "iconic" is used to describe a wide range of people, places, and things. Some commentators believe that the word "iconic" is overused.

== Examples ==
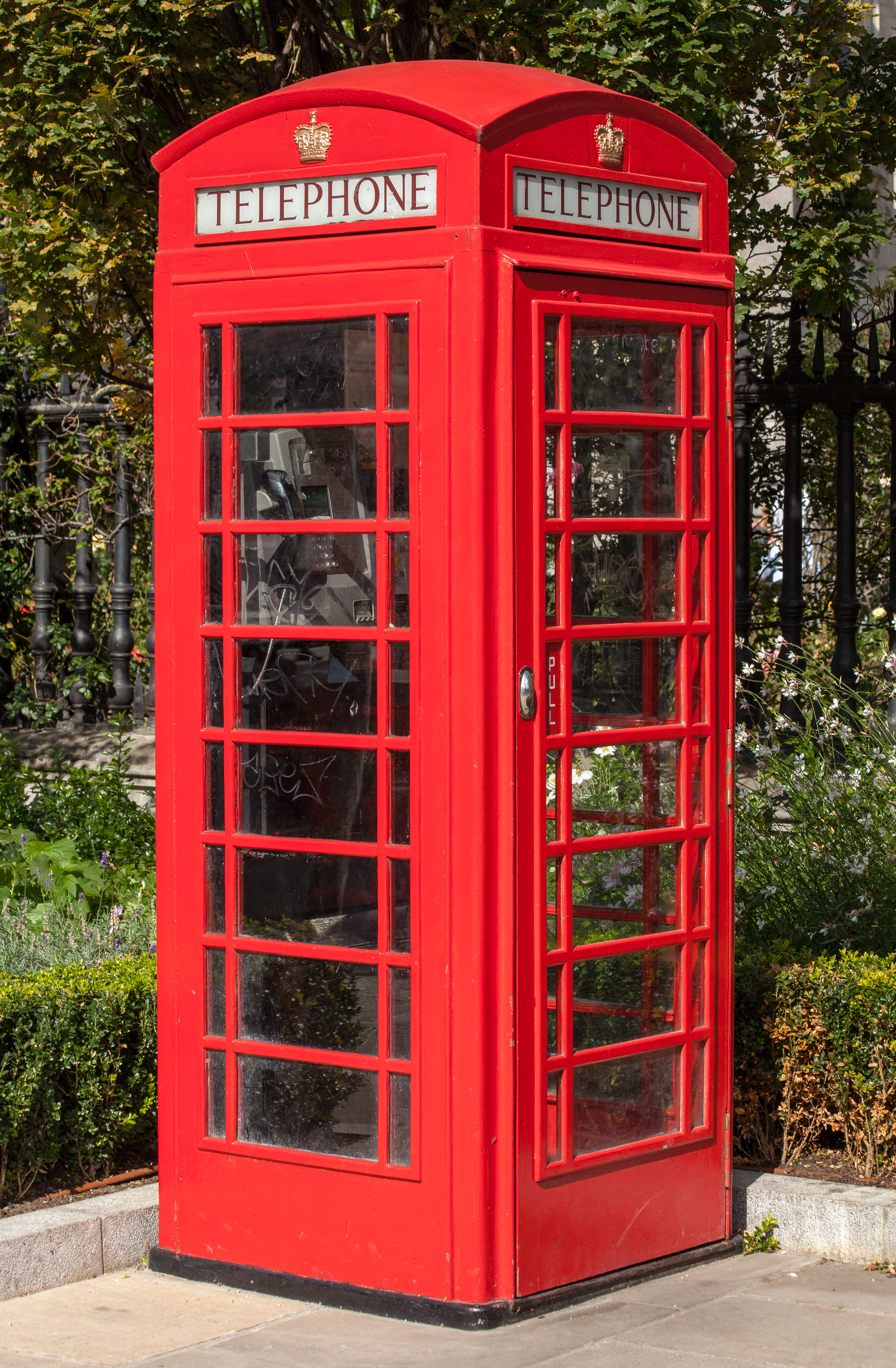
A red telephone box is a British cultural icon.

According to the Canadian Journal of Communication, academic literature has described all of the following as "cultural icons": Shakespeare, Oprah, Batman, Anne of Green Gables, the cowboy, the 1960s female pop singer, the horse, Las Vegas, the library, the Barbie doll, DNA, and the New York Yankees." A web-based survey was set up in 2006 allowing the public to nominate their ideas for national icons of England, and the results show the range of different types of icons associated with an English view of English culture. One example is the red AEC Routemaster London double-decker bus.

Matryoshka dolls are seen internationally as cultural icons of Russia. In the former Soviet Union, the hammer and sickle symbol and statues of Vladimir Lenin instead represented the country's most prominent cultural icons.

The values, norms, and ideals represented by a cultural icon vary among people who subscribe to it and more widely among others who may interpret cultural icons as symbolizing quite different values. Thus an apple pie is a cultural icon of the United States, but its significance varies among Americans.

National icons can become targets for those opposing or criticising a regime, for example, crowds destroying statues of Lenin in Eastern Europe after the fall of communism or burning the American flag to protest US actions abroad.

Religious icons can also become cultural icons in societies where religion and culture are deeply entwined, such as representations of the Madonna in societies with a strong Catholic tradition.

== Criticism ==
Describing something as iconic or as an icon has become very common in the popular media. This has drawn criticism from some. Mark Larson of the Christian Examiner labeled "iconic" as an overused word, finding over 18,000 uses of "iconic" in news stories alone, with another 30,000 for "icon". Journalists in search of less clichéd alternatives could instead consider: distinctive, celebrated, historic, legendary, famous, prominent, famed, popular, renowned, noted, notable, eminent, venerated, leading, distinguished, esteemed, famed, beloved, remarkable and multiple other synonyms.

== Types ==
- Architectural icon
- Gay icon
- Pop icon

== Bibliography ==
- Biedermann, Hans (1994). Dictionary of Symbolism: Cultural Icons and the Meanings Behind Them. Meridan.
- Brooker, Will (2001). Batman Unmasked: Analysing a Cultural Icon. Continuum.
- Edwards, Peter; Enenkel, Karl; Graham, Elspeth, eds. (2011). The Horse as Cultural Icon: The Real and the Symbolic Horse in the Early Modern World. Brill.
- Foudy, Julie; Leslie Heywood; Shari L Dworkin (2003). Built to Win: The Female Athlete as Cultural Icon. University of Minnesota Press.
- Gilbert, Erik (2008). The Dhow as Cultural Icon. Boston University.* Heyer, Paul (2012). Titanic Century: Media, Myth, and the Making of a Cultural Icon. Praeger.
- Heyer, Paul (2012). Titanic Century: Media, Myth, and the Making of a Cultural Icon. Praeger.
- Meyer, Denis C. (2010). Cles Pour la France en 80 Icones Culturelles. Hachette.
- Nelkin, Dorothy; M Susan Lindee (2004). The DNA Mystique: The Gene as a Cultural Icon. University of Michigan Press.
- Reydams-Schils, Gretchen J (2003). Plato's Timaeus as Cultural Icon. University of Notre Dame Press.
