= Hamid Mowlana =

Iranian-American author and academic (born 1937)

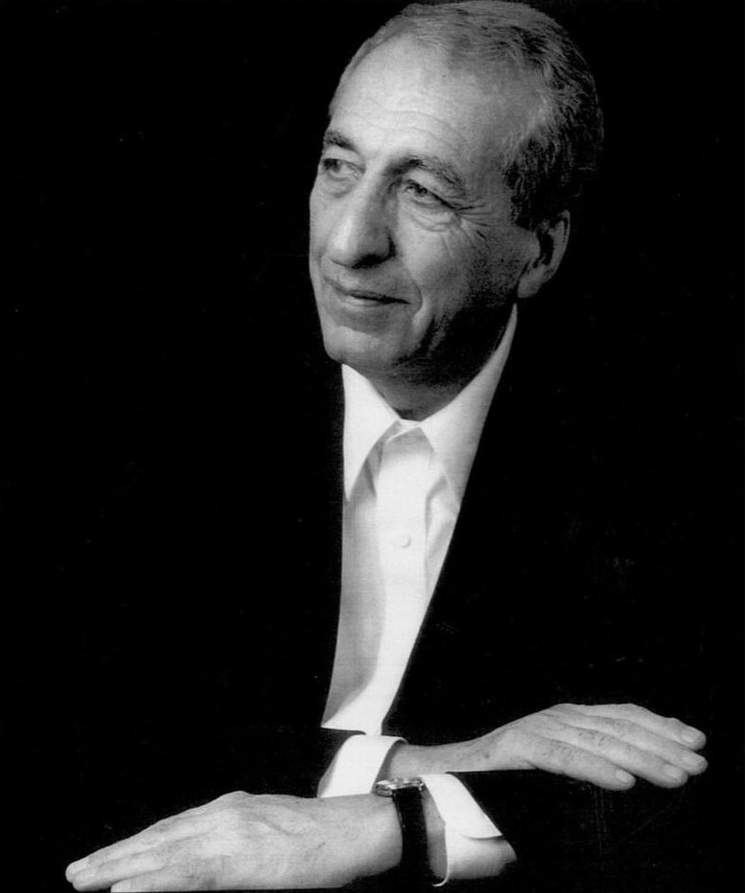
- Born: February 25, 1937 (age 89); East Azerbaijan Province, Iran
- Education: Northwestern University
- Occupations: Professor; Author
- Employer: American University
- Known for: International and intercultural communication theories; communication as cultural ecology in international relations

Hamid Mowlana (Persian: حمید مولانا, Hamid Molana, born in Tabriz, East Azerbaijan, Iran) is an Iranian-American author and academic. He is professor emeritus of international relations in the School of International Services at American University in Washington, D.C. He was an advisor to the former Iranian President Mahmoud Ahmadinejad.

== Early life ==
Mowlana was born into an educational and scholarly family. His grandfather, Grand Ayatollah Seyyed Muhammad Mowlana, was a leading Islamic jurisprudent (faqih) and a community leader. His great uncle, Haji-Mirza Hassan Roshdieh, was a founder of modern educational and teaching methods in Iran. He is a descendant of the Iranian mystic poet, Qasim-i Anvar (1356-1433), and his ancestry dates back to Imam Musa al-Kazim (745-799) in the early Islamic history.

At the age of twenty-six, after the completion of his Ph.D. degree at Northwestern, he served as editor-in-chief of Kayhan daily in Iran in 1963. However, he resigned from that position shortly and returned to the United States in pursuit of an academic life.

== Education and academic career ==
Mowlana was founding director of the International Communication Program in the School of International Service at American University from 1968 to 2005. He has also served as a visiting professor or guest scholar in Africa, Asia, Europe, and Latin America. He was instrumental in establishing the first degree program in international and intercultural communication studies. He obtained his B.S. in economics in 1959 and earned his M.S. in journalism in 1960 and his PhD in communication and political science in 1963 from Northwestern University. Furthermore, he served on the faculty of the University of Tennessee in Knoxville from 1965 to 1968 before moving to American University in Washington, D.C.

In 1963 Mowlana discovered the well preserved and original copy of the first Iranian newspaper called Kaqaze Akhbar, published in Tehran in 1837, in the files of the British Museum Library in London and came a cross further evidence of the paper's existence in the files of the Royal Asiatic Society, also based in London, and thus changed the beginning of Iranian journalism history to fourteen years earlier - from 1851 to 1837.

Between 1950s and 1970s, he has contributed articles on international affairs to a number of American media organizations including The Miami Herald (Knight Newspapers), The Sacramento Bee (McClatchy Newspapers), and has collaborated with ABC, NBC, and CBS on a number of public affairs programs. He has testified before Congressional committees on international issues.

Mowlana has worked for UNESCO in Paris and is a former president of the International Association for Media and Communication Research (IAMCR). He wrote regularly for Kayhan daily, one of the main leading newspapers in Iran during the 1990s and 2000s. As of 2019 Mowlana's bibliography listed over 1400 printed works (books, book chapters, journal articles, book reviews, and magazine and newspaper articles).

Mowlana has served on the editorial board of a number of scholarly and scientific journals. He was a founding editor of the Journal of International Communication and Journal of Intercultural Communication & Interactions Research. He was also a contributing editor of the Journal of Communication as well as the mass media editor of Intellect of the Society for Advancement of Education. His 1986 book, Global Information and World Communication: New Frontiers in International Communication, was selected as "communication book of the year" by American Professional Librarians.

Mowlana received a number of awards including the University Faculty Award for Outstanding Scholarship, Research and Other Professional Contributions in 1993, the International Communication Association's Award for Outstanding Research in 1977, American University's School of International Service Award for Outstanding Contribution to Academic Development in 1980 and 1988 and for Thirty Years of Distinguished Leadership and Scholarship in 1998, and the Scholar/Teacher of the Year Award in 2000. He was also the recipient of the International Studies Association's Distinguished Senior Scholar Award in International Communication at its 43rd Annual Conference held in New Orleans, Louisiana in 2002.

Mowlana was honored by the Iranian universities and academies for his life achievements and was designated nationally in Iran as an "Eternal One"—"Chehrehaye Mandegar" in 2003. On the Persian tradition honoring noted scholars he was named as an honorary advisor to the former Iranian President Mahmoud Ahmadinejad.

Mowlana's scholarly works extend over a number of disciplines including political science, economics, sociology, communication and philosophy. He is best known for his "integrated theory of communication and international relations", his "five dimensional model of human communication", and his "monistic-emancipatory framework" of socio-economic development. His theoretical works on "communication as cultural ecology" and "Islamic communication ethics" have been widely published.

== Honorary advisor ==
On August 19, 2008, the Islamic Republic News Agency, reported that President Mahmoud Ahmadinejad had appointed Mowlana as his advisor, asking Mowlana to help with the objectives of his government in "providing justice, friendship, serving the society, and promotion of public life status."

== Major publications ==
=== Books ===
- Mowlana, H. (1971). International Communication: A Selected Bibliography. Dubuque, IA: Kendall/Hunt.
- Mowlana, H., Trezise, J., & Stovall, J. (Eds.). (1980). Watergate: A Crisis for the World—A Survey of British and French Press Toward an American Political Crisis. Oxford, England: Pergamon Press.
- Mowlana, H. (1985). International Flow of Information: A Global Report and Analysis (Reports and Papers on Mass Communication, No. 99). Paris, France: UNESCO.
- Mowlana, H. (1985). International Flow of News: An Annotated Bibliography. Paris, France: UNESCO.
- Mowlana, H. (1985). International Flow of Information: A Global Report and Analysis. Paris, France: UNESCO.
- Mowlana, H. (1988). Development: A Field in Search for Itself. Leicester, England: International Association for Media and Communication Research.
- Mowlana, H. (1996). Global Communication in Transition: The End of Diversity? Thousand Oaks, CA: Sage.
- Mowlana, H. (1997). Global Information and World Communication: New Frontiers in International Relations (2nd ed.). London, UK: Sage.
- Mowlana, H. (2011). Islam and the Crises of the Contemporary World. Tehran, Iran: Elmi & Farhangi.
- Mowlana, H., & Wilson, L. J. (1988). Communication Technology and Development. Paris, France: UNESCO.
- Mowlana, H., & Wilson, L. J. (1990). The Passing of Modernity: Communication and the Transformation of Society. White Plains, NY: Longman.

=== Edited books ===
- Mowlana, H. (Ed.). (1989). Aspects of the Mass Media Declaration of Unesco (International Association for Mass Communication Research, Occasional Papers, No. 9). Budapest, Hungary: Hungarian Institute for Public Opinion Research.
- Mowlana, H., & Frondorf, H. M. (Eds.). (1992). The Media As a Forum for Community Building. Washington, DC: School of Advanced International Studies, Johns Hopkins University.
- Mowlana, H., Gerbner, G., & Schiller, H. I. (Eds.). (1992). Triumph of the Image: The Media's War in the Persian Gulf—A Global Perspective. Boulder, CO: Westview Press.
- Mowlana, H., & Levinson, N. (Eds.). (1991). Telecommunications and International Relations: An East–west Perspective. Washington, DC: School of International Service, American University.
- Gerbner, G., Mowlana, H., & Nordenstreng, K. (Eds.). (1993). The Global Media Debate: Its Rise, Fall, and Renewal. Norwood, NJ: Ablex.
- Gerbner, G., Mowlana, H., & Schiller, H. I. (Eds.). (1996). Invisible Crises: What Conglomerate Control of Media Means for America and the World. Boulder, CO: Westview Press.
- Kamalipour, Y., & Mowlana, H. (Eds.). (1994). Mass Media in the Middle East: A Comprehensive Handbook. Westport, CT: Greenwood Press.

=== Articles ===
- Mowlana, H. (1962). Chicago: how PR men and reporters see city hall. Add/1: Reports in Professional Journalism, Medill School of Journalism, Northwestern University, 1(4), 10-18.
- Mowlana, H. (1967). Capital formation in the Middle East: A study of human factors in economic development. Tennessee Survey of Business, 3(1), 1–9.
- Mowlana, H., & McLaughlin, G. (1969). Some variables interacting with media exposure among foreign students. Sociology and Social Research, 53(4), 110–118.
- Mowlana, H. (1974). The Communication dimension of international studies in the United States: A quantitative assessment. International Journal of Communication Research, 1(1), 1-24.
- Mowlana, H. (1975). Who covers America? Journal of Communication, 25(3), 78–85.
- Mowlana. H. (1975). A Paradigm for source analysis in events data research. International Interaction, 2(1), 24–35.
- Mowlana, H. (1979). Technology versus tradition: Communication in the Iranian revolution. Journal of Communication, 29(3), 107–112.
- Mowlana, H. (1983). Mass media and culture: Toward an integrated theory. In W. B. Gudykunst (Ed.), Intercultural communication theory: Current perspectives (pp. 149–170). Beverly Hills, CA: Sage.
- Mowlana, H. (1993). The new global order and cultural ecology. Media, Culture and Society, 15(1), 9–27.
- Mowlana, H. (1994). Civil society, information society, and Islamic society: A comparative perspective. In S. Splichal, A. Calabrese, & C. Sparks (Eds.), Information society and civil society: Contemporary perspectives on the changing world order (pp. 208–232). West Lafayette, IN: Purdue University Press.
- Mowlana, H. (1994). Shapes of the future: International communication in the 21st century. Journal of International Communication, 1(1), 14–32.
- Mowlana, H. (2001). Communication and development: Theoretical and methodological problems and prospects. In S. R. Melkote & S. Rao (Eds.), Critical issues in communication: Looking inward for answers—Essays in honor of K. E. Eapen (pp. 179–187). New Delhi, India: Sage.
- Mowlana, H. (2001) Comunicazione globale come ecologica cultural. In C. Padovani (Ed.), Communication, globale democrazi, sovranita, culture. Torino, Italy: UTET, Librenig.
- Mowlana, H. (2003). Communication, philosophy and religion. Journal of International Communication, 9(1), 11–34.
- Mowlana, H. (2009). The Muslim presence in America. Al-Taghrib: A Quarterly Journal of Islamic Unity, 4(1), 168–179.
- Mowlana, H. (2012). International communication: The journey of a caravan. Journal of International Communication, 18(2), 267–290.
- Mowlana, H. (2014). Communication and cultural settings: An Islamic perspective. In M. K. Asante, Y. Miike, & J. Yin (Eds.), The global intercultural communication reader (2nd ed., pp. 237–247). New York, NY: Routledge.
- Mowlana, H. (2014). Global communication as cultural ecology. China Media Research, 10(3), 1–6.
- Mowlana, H. (2016). The role of media in contemporary international relations: Culture and politics at the crossroads. Journal of Multicultural Discourses, 11(1), 84–96.
- Mowlana, H. (2018). On human communication. Javnost—The Public, 25(1/2), 226–232.
- Mowlana, H., & Chenjune, W. (2018). An intergenerational conversation of international communication. Journal of International Communication, 24(2), 164–195.
- Mowlana, H. (2019). Human communication theory: A five-dimensional model. Journal of International Communication, 25(1), 3–33.
- Mowlana, H., & Agbobli, C. (2019). Let me tell you about international communication, its specifics issues, theories, and methods. Communiquer: Revue de Communication Social et International, 25(1), 99–110.
- Mowlana, H. (2021). Abu Reyhan Biruni: The founder of anthropology and intercultural communication studies. Journal of International Communication, 27(1), 1–14.
- Mowlana, H. (2021). The cultural dimensions of the coronavirus crisis: Soft power revisited. Journal of Multicultural Discourses, 16(1), 1–11.
- Mowlana, H. (2021). The non-Western legacy: Biruni as a pioneer of intercultural thinking and studies. Journal of Intercultural Communication and Interactions Research, 1(1), 135–142.
- Mowlana, H. (2022). Paradigmatic debates, theoretical diversity, and the IAMCR: A historical perspective. In Y. Miike & J. Yin (Eds.), The handbook of global interventions in communication theory (pp. 42–60). New York, NY: Routledge.
- Mowlana, H. (2024). Intercultural Communication and Interactions: A History and Critque. In Shi-xu (Ed.), The Routledge Handbook of Cultural Discourse Studies (pp. 70-84). New York, NY: Routledge.

=== Selected books in Persian ===
- Mowlana, H. (2022). Ertebatate Ensan (On Human Communication). Tehran: 1mam Sadiq University Publications, 1401.
- Mowlana, H. (2020). Falsafeh Enghelabe Islami Dar Iran (The Philosophy of the Islamic Revolution in Iran) Three Volumes. Tehran: Soroush Publications, 1399.
- Mowlana, H. (2020). Dar Bareh Ertebatat: Ertebatat Va Tajjalye on Dar Adabiyat Va Shere Farsi (Communication and its Manifestations in the Persian Literature and Poetry). Tehran: Soroush Publications, 1399.
- Mowlana, H. (2012). Rahavarde Andishe (The Harvest of Thought) Four Volumes. Tehran: Elmi Va Farhangi Publications, 1391.
- Mowlana, H. (2011). Danishe Ertebatat (The Knowledge of Communication). Tehran: Nashr Publications, 1390.
- Mowlana, H. (2012). Ertebatate Beinul-Melal Va Mian Farhangi (International and Intercultural Communication). Tehran: Nashr Publications, 1391.
- Mowlana, H. (2012). Ertebatat Ejtemai Dar Iran: As Mashroteh Ta Enghelabe Islami (Social Communication in Iran: From the Constitutional Movement to the Islamic Revolution). Nashr Publications. 1391.
- Mowlana, H. (2011). Amrica Shenasi: Farazo Froodeh Yek Empratori (Understanding America: The Rise and Decline of an Empire). Tehran: Amir Kabir Publications, 1390.
- Mowlana, H. (2011). Pishraft Va Ta,ali (Progress and Development). Tehran: Daftare Motaleat Va Barnamerizi Rasaneh Publications, 1390.
- Mowlana, H. (2006). Astoreh Democracy (The Myth of Democracy). Tehran: Kayhan Publications, 1385.
- Mowlana. H. (2006). Jahane Islam Va Chalesh-haye Donyaye Moaser (Islam and the Challenges of the Contemporary World). Kayhan Publications, 1385.
- Mowlana, H. (2003). Algoye Matboate Va Rasanehaye Islami (The Model of Islamic Communication Media). Tehran: Pojuhedishe Farhang Va Andishe Islami, 1382.
- Mowlana, H. (2003). Jame-ye Madani (Civil Society). Tehran: Pojuheshgahe Farhang Va Andishe Islami Publications, 1382.
- Mowlana, H. (2001). Zoohor Va Soogote Modern (The Rise and Fall of Modernity). Tehran: Sobh Publications, 1380
- Mowlana, H. (2000). Ma ra Koja Mibarand (Where Are They Taking Us). Tehran: Kayhan Publication, 1379.
- Mowlana, H. (1979). Seyre Ertebatate Ejtemai Dar Iran (Social Communication in Iran). Tehran: College of Social Sciences Publications, 1357.

=== Works about Mowlana ===
- Zahra Nazari and Ahmad Pishgahzadeh, Editor, A Bibliography of Hamid Mowlana, Third Edition, Ketabdar Publications, Tehran, 2019.
- Karim Fayzi, Hamid Mowlana: Tanine Ta-ah-hud (Resonance of Commitment), Nashre Shookofeh Yas Publications, Tehran, 1380 (2001).
- Karim Fayzi, Safire Sedaghat: Zendegie, Afkar va Andishehaie Hamid Mowlana (Envoy of Truth), Daftare Nashre Farhang Islami Publications, Tehran, 1381 (2002).
- Honoring Professor Hamid Mowlana, Statements by Professor George Gerbner, Herbert I. Schiller, Gertrude J. Robinson, Naren Chitty, and Christine B.N. Chin, International Studies Association. Annual Conference, New Orlean, Louisiana, March 2002.
- "Iranitarin Daneshmande on Soya Marz-ha (The Leading Iranian Scholar Beyond National Borders), Keyhan Farhangi, (Special issue devoted to Hamid Mowlana’s works and life ), Tir 1381 (July 2002).
- "Qarb Shenasi: Tosif ya Tahlil (The Studies of Western Civilization: Description or Analysis), Kayhan Farhangi, (Special Issue devoted to Hamid Mowlana’s works), Mordad va Shahrivar 1375 (August and September, 1996).
- Hamid Mowlana and Chenjun Wang, "An Intergenerational Conversation on International Communication," Journal of International Communication, 24(2), 165–195.

== See also ==
- Communication theory
- Cross-cultural communication
- Development communication
- International communication
- Politics of Iran
