= Alexander Wade (disambiguation) =

Alexander Wade or Alex Wade may refer to:

- Alexander Wade (1832–1904), American educator
- Alex Wade (born 1966), British freelance journalist and media lawyer
- Alex Wade (musician), guitarist in the band Whitechapel
