= Daniel McNeil (disambiguation) =

Daniel McNeil (1853–1918) was a Canadian lawyer, judge and politician.

Daniel McNeil or McNeill may also refer to:

- Daniel McNeil (historian), British historian and scholar
- Daniel McNeill (1947–2017), American politician
- Dan K. McNeill (born 1946), United States Army general

== See also ==
- Dan MacNeill, American football coach
- Daniel MacNeill (1885–1946), Canadian politician
- Daniel McNeill Parker (1822–1907), Canadian politician
