= Journal of International Communication =

- Discipline: Communication studies, International relations
- Language: English
- Edited by: Naren Chitty

Publication details
- History: 1992-present
- Publisher: Routledge
- Frequency: Biannual

Standard abbreviations
- ISO 4: J. Int. Commun.

Indexing
- ISSN: 1321-6597 (print); 2158-3471 (web)
- OCLC no.: 988805499

Links
- Journal homepage; Online access; Online archive

The Journal of International Communication is a biannual, peer-reviewed, academic journal covering the intersection of international relations and communication studies.

== Journal scope ==
The Journal of International Communication is a biannual, peer-reviewed journal publishing original research in communication studies and related topics within the fields of sociology, post-colonial studies, international political economy, and international relations.

== Publication history ==
The Journal of International Communication was established at Macquarie University in Sydney, Australia, and launched internationally at the 19th General Assembly of the International Association of Mass Communication Research (IAMCR) in Souel, South Korea, in 1994. The journal has been published by Routledge since 2011. Naren Chitty has been Editor-in-Chief since its founding. The journal has historically addressed a wide range of issues in global, international, intercultural, and development communication such as media and foreign policy, international telecommunication policy, public diplomacy, and soft power.

== Abstracting and indexing ==
Journal of International Communication is abstracted and indexed in Scopus.

== Landmark papers ==
Landmark papers published by the journal include Roland Robertson's "Globalisation or Glocalisation?" and Halim Rane's "Social media, social movements and the diffusion of ideas in the Arab uprisings". World-renowned distinguished scholars such as Brenda Dervin, George Gerbner, D. Shelton A. Gunaratne, Cees Hamelink, Marwan M. Kraidy, Hamid Mowlana, Joseph Nye, Jr., Jan Servaes, Majid Tehranian, and Stella Ting-Toomey also contributed milestone articles to the journal.
