= The Canadian Conspiracy =

1986 Canadian mockumentary film

- Directed by: Robert Boyd
- Written by: Mark Achbar; Robert Boyd; Michael Short
- Produced by: Bill House; Barbara Tranter
- Starring: Lorne Greene; John Candy; Eugene Levy; Leslie Nielsen; William Shatner; Martin Short; Margot Kidder; Anne Murray; Dave Thomas; Tommy Chong; Susan Clark
- Narrated by: Damir Andrei
- Edited by: Dave Goard
- Music by: Marc Jordan; John Capek
- Release date: 8 June 1986
- Running time: 90 minutes
- Country: Canada
- Language: English

The Canadian Conspiracy is a 1986 CBC Television mockumentary, directed by Robert Boyd and co-written by Boyd, Mark Achbar and Mike Short. It parodies American Cold War propaganda films and tabloid journalism, using archival clips and interviews with notable Canadian entertainers to build a narrative that the Canadian government has for decades been training agents to infiltrate and take over the American entertainment industry for the purpose of subverting American culture in preparation for a Canadian invasion of the United States.

The film stars numerous celebrities as fictionalized versions of themselves, including Eugene Levy, Lorne Greene, Leslie Nielsen, William Shatner, Margot Kidder, Dave Thomas, John Candy, Anne Murray and Tommy Chong. It won two Gemini Awards and was nominated for an International Emmy Award.

== Synopsis ==
Title cards indicate that an American News Network (ANN) special is being broadcast in its entirety by CBC Television due to the severity of its accusations. News anchor Edwin Newman states that the unprecedented report is the result of two years of investigations, and advises viewer discretion due to its shocking nature.

ANN camera crews surveil, ambush and chase their suspects, encountering an "impenetrable wall of silence". Then, shortly before the broadcast, actor Eugene Levy turned informer and exposed the Canadian government plot to conquer America.

Archival film clips show Canadian pioneers in early Hollywood as influential figures; what kept them from totally blending in was their "fanatical sense of national identity", including an intolerance for jokes about the climate of Canada. During a 1948 state visit, Harry Truman told William Lyon Mackenzie King the joke about "a Canadian ice fisherman who caught forty pounds of ice." King was infuriated and swore to avenge this insult by recalling all the Canadians working in Hollywood. Mary Pickford met with King in September 1948, but he was unable to convince her or other Canadians to abandon their American careers. As a result, King resigned as prime minister and was succeeded by Louis St. Laurent.

St. Laurent devised a new plan: to recruit the country's best people, train them, and send them to infiltrate the new US television industry. To lead the program they selected Lorne Greene, known as the "voice of doom", then a news announcer with the Canadian Broadcasting Corporation (CBC). (Note: The CBC was originally a radio network, with television services added in 1952.) They named the training centre the Lorne Greene School of Broadcasting (LGSOB) and it had many notable graduates (Note: Alumni of the Lorne Green School include Raymond Burr, Yvonne DeCarlo, Alan Young and Leslie Nielsen) before it was destroyed under suspicious circumstances, concealing its top-secret activities.

The LGSOB was immediately replaced by CBC Television, created in 1952 as the command post of the conspiracy. Soundproofed studios were used to brainwash agents, ensuring their unwavering loyalty, while it was an accepted fact that the best talent would move to the US. Monty Hall developed the game show format to erode American values. Rich Little learned impersonations and satire, used to mock US presidents. Science fiction was pioneered by James Doohan, who along with William Shatner operated Star Trek, which transforms its viewers into a cult-like following. With these widespread operations, Lorne Greene headed the west coast wing of the conspiracy, monitoring the many agents while he starred in Bonanza.

certain tv shows [...] with a dominant Canadian influence, that were particularly destructive [...] These Canadian shows screwed us up good.

— Dr. Joyce Brothers

In 1963, Prime Minister Lester B. Pearson adds a dedicated comedy-training program to the conspiracy, headed by comedy duo Johnny Wayne and Frank Shuster, who had "infiltrated" The Ed Sullivan Show a record 67 times. Public universities served as fronts for Wayne and Shuster schools across Canada, which created a "potent strike force of comedians". The American perception of humour is grievously affected, and by the late 1960s protests and civil disobedience is rampant.

In 1968, Prime Minister Pierre Trudeau became incensed when the Canadian-controlled show The Smothers Brothers Comedy Hour was cancelled due to a monologue by operative David Steinberg. Trudeau has the show replaced by Hee Haw, another production overseen by Canadians.

The narrator suggests that Lorne Greene is connected to green cards, required by the growing number of Canadians working in the US, and that he is also connected to Lorne Michaels. After marrying Frank Shuster's daughter, Michaels was ordered on Operation Manhattan as producer of Saturday Night Live, a haven for Canadians. (Note: From its beginning through the 1985–86 television season, actors and writers on Saturday Night Live included Canadians Dan Aykroyd, Peter Aykroyd, Robin Duke, Sean Kelly, Bruce McCall, Bruce McCulloch, Mark McKinney, Lorne Michaels, Tony Rosato, Paul Shaffer, Martin Short, and Rosie Shuster. Numerous other Canadians appeared as musical guests and hosts.) In 1982, Michaels assigned Paul Shaffer to Late Night with David Letterman. By the mid-1980s, four of the top five Hollywood comedy films were controlled by the conspiracy. (Note: The four comedy films referenced are: M*A*S*H (1970) starring Donald Sutherland; Up in Smoke (1978) co-written/co-starring Tommy Chong; Porky's (1981) produced by Don Carmody for Astral Media and starring Kim Cattrall and Susan Clark; and Ghostbusters (1984) directed by Ivan Reitman, co-written/co-starring Dan Aykroyd, with supporting actor Rick Moranis.) LGSOB alumnus Leslie Nielsen is revealed to be the brother of Erik Nielsen, Canada's then-current deputy prime minister and minister of defence.

The conspiracy also produced an increasing number of music records for American listeners. (Note: The musical acts referred to are Guy Lombardo, Percy Faith, The Crewcuts, The Four Lads, The Diamonds, Paul Anka, Steppenwolf, The Band, The Guess Who, Gordon Lightfoot, Joni Mitchell, Leonard Cohen, Rush, Bachman–Turner Overdrive, Gino Vannelli, Triumph, Loverboy, Lorne Greene, Bryan Adams, Corey Hart, Platinum Blonde, Neil Young, Oscar Peterson, and Anne Murray.) Anne Murray's song "Snowbird" is shown to contain the backmasked message: "The Canadians are coming. The Canadians are coming. Surrender peacefully and you will not be harmed." Another operation of the conspiracy is the board game Trivial Pursuit, which disrupts American leisure time.

US security forces say that they are unable to stop the conspiracy, as Canadians are indistinguishable from Americans. Examining why the major US networks have not reported on the conspiracy, it is noted that both Peter Jennings, head anchor of ABC News, and Morley Safer, co-host of CBS's 60 Minutes, are Canadians, implying a cover-up.

Reviewing the conspiracy plot, the narrator predicts horrific effects if nothing is done and Americans are made into Canadians, showing street crowds emulating Bob and Doug McKenzie. In Los Angeles, Levy is exhausted and hopes to put the conspiracy behind him.

== Cast ==
In roles:

- Gratien Gélinas as Robert Bertrand, a cabinet minister in the Mackenzie King government
- Deborah Cass as Shelly Bloom, LGSOB alumnus
- Keith Knight
- Chris Tate – Tate is also credited as the key grip on the production.
- Alan Wilbee
- Mickey Costello
- Michael Kohut
- George Buza as Ted Zemekis, US Immigration officer
- Bruce Vavrina
- Michael Copeman
- Bernard Behrens as Senior FBI Official
- Linda Sorensen as Maria Velasquez, Mexican Consul-General to New York
- Damir Andrei as Narrator

As fictionalized versions of themselves:

- Eugene Levy
- Martin Mull
- Lorne Greene
- Lorne Michaels
- Leslie Nielsen
- John Candy
- Peter Jennings
- Morley Safer
- Ivan Reitman
- William Shatner
- Martin Short
- Howie Mandel
- Dave Thomas
- Anne Murray
- Margot Kidder
- Susan Clark
- Edwin Newman (Note: Newman anchored news broadcasts for NBC for more than two decades, retiring in 1984. That year he began appearing in comedies, hosting Saturday Night Live twice and anchoring its fake newscast.)
- Monty Hall
- Tommy Chong
- Alan Thicke
- Rich Little
- Dr. Joyce Brothers
- Doug Henning
- David Steinberg
- Donald Sutherland
- Steve Martin

There are also a dozen brief man-on-the-street interviews conducted in Canada and the United States.

== Production ==
The film was produced by Bill House and Barbara Tranter of Toronto-based Shtick Productions, for the Canadian Broadcasting Corporation with financial assistance from Telefilm Canada. It was made under the working title The Big Shtick: A Canadian Conspiracy.

The film was directed by Robert Boyd and co-written by Boyd, Mark Achbar and Mike Short. Original music was composed and recorded by Marc Jordan and John Capek. It was edited by Dave Goard with a running time of 90 minutes.

The celebrities who feature in the mockumentary's interviews were each paid an honorarium of US$500. Archival film clips were provided by the CBC, the Public Archives of Canada, the National Film Board of Canada (NFB), Bellevue Pathé Quebec, and various film and television production companies.

== Themes and analysis ==
Cultural researcher Jody Berland writes that the film shows its creators' amusement and frustration at their invisible outsider status in the United States. In the film, the United States is cast as a xenophobic imperial culture which fails to appreciate the differences of others, seeing less powerful nations as "either dangerous enemies [or] less successful versions of themselves." The Canadians who can pass seamlessly as Americans are presented through a sensational, paranoid filter as dangerous to American culture and politics. This ironic and satirical take is understood by domestic audiences who know that Canada has an insignificant influence upon the American cultural monolith. The satire is also taken to be a fantasy of reverse colonization through the Canadian "star system in exile".

Stereotypes of Canada and Canadians are heavily played upon for humour, particularly the stereotype of Canadians as good and kind neighbours which is satirized in the film's sinister plot. Another frequently referenced stereotype is the climate of Canada. Early in the film, the saying "Canada has only two seasons: winter and July" is established as an offensive joke, but is reinforced as a "true" statement when a camera crew ventures outside in Canada during the "brief summer thaw in July", through a sequence describing the difficulty constructing on permafrost, and through archival film clips which juxtapose mild weather in US cities with Toronto during a blizzard and which portray Canadians crossing the US border on showshoes and sledding and ice-fishing during May.

Colin Tait re-examined The Canadian Conspiracy in 2010 in the context of multinational labour currents in media studies journal Flow. He noted that American TV shows generally have a Canadian in their principal casts, representing a "brain drain" of top talent from Canada, though this has become balanced somewhat by an increasing number of American shows which moved production to the "Hollywood North" of Canada. Of these, Tait found Conspiracy's theme adapted in Vancouver-shot Battlestar Galactica, in which human-like robots infiltrate and dominate a human population – with Canadians actors playing six of the nine robot models.

== Release ==
The film premiered on CBC Television on 8 June 1986. It was rebroadcast by CBC on New Year's Eve 1986.

HBO-Cinemax acquired first broadcast rights in the United States.

== Reception ==
=== Critical response ===
Mike Boone of the Montreal Gazette wrote that the film was a clever satire with an innovative presentation; he praised the editing and research and compared it to the Woody Allen mockumentaries Take the Money and Run and Zelig. He found parts of it very funny but felt that the humour became uneven in the last half-hour. Michael Dorland came to a similar conclusion in a mixed review for Cinema Canada, appreciating the archival clips and editing but finding the humour, while at times brilliant, to become repetitive and overplayed.

Sid Adilman of the Toronto Star strongly recommended it as "wicked fare". He placed it on his list of the best television of the first half of 1986. Also writing for the Star, Terry Poulton called the film an ingenious parody of an expose which is "as incontrovertible as it is preposterous."

In 2016, Jesse Walker of American magazine Reason recommended it as a mockumentary "that'll prime you to imagine Ted Cruz as a Calgarian Candidate aiming to eradicate American independence".

=== Awards and nominations ===
The film won Best Entertainment Special (Note: This was the only year that the Gemini Awards had a category for Best Entertainment Special.) and Best Direction in a Comedy/Variety/Entertainment/Performing Arts Program or Series at the 1986 Gemini Awards. (Note: The Gemini Awards ceremony was hosted by The Canadian Conspiracy cast members Eugene Levy and Dave Thomas, along with fellow SCTV alumnus Andrea Martin. Presenter Lorne Greene received a standing ovation.)

It was nominated for an International Emmy Award for Best Popular Arts Program.

| Year | Ceremony | Category | Nominee or recipient | Result | Ref |
|---|---|---|---|---|---|
| 1986 | 1st Gemini Awards | Best Entertainment Special | Bill House, Barbara Tranter | Won | |
| 1986 | 1st Gemini Awards | Best Direction in a Comedy or Variety Program or Series | Robert Boyd | Won | |
| 1986 | 14th International Emmy Awards | Best Popular Arts Program | | Nominated | |
