= Minnesota Christian Chronicle =

The Minnesota Christian Examiner is a Christian newspaper published monthly in the Twin Cities metro region. It was called the Twin Cities Christian from 1978 to 1993 and the Minnesota Christian Chronicle from 1993 to 2011. The newspaper reports on regional, national news and events from a Christian perspective. A tabloid-size newspaper, the Minnesota Christian Examiner is published by Selah Media Group which also publishes the Christian Examiner newspapers in California and Washington state making it the largest group of Christian newspapers with more than 170,000 copies monthly.
