= Daniel McNeil (historian) =

British historian and scholar

- Education: B.A.H. in History, Oxford University (2001), M.A. in History/Ethnic and Pluralism Studies (2002), Ph.D. in History (2007), University of Toronto
- Occupations: Historian, cultural studies scholar, professor
- Employer: University of Birmingham
- Notable work: Thinking While Black, Sex and Race in the Black Atlantic
- Title: Professor and Stuart Hall Interdisciplinary Chair
- Awards: Stuart Hall Outstanding Mentor Award (2025); Editor's Award, Canadian Journal of Communication (2022); Carleton University Research Award (2015)

Academic background
- Education: Oxford University, University of Toronto

Academic work
- Discipline: History, Cultural Studies
- Sub-discipline: Black Atlantic Studies, Diaspora Studies, Public Humanities, Migration and Multiculturalism
- Main interests: Black Studies and liberation, black student activism and critique, globalization and black health

Daniel McNeil is a British historian, public intellectual and cultural studies scholar specialising in Black Atlantic Studies, Diaspora Studies and anti-racist education. As of 2025, McNeil is the inaugural Stuart Hall Interdisciplinary Chair at the University of Birmingham.

== Early life and education ==
Originally from Merseyside, England, McNeil has a B.A.H. from Oxford University. He earned an M.A. in History/Ethnic and Pluralism Studies from the University of Toronto, where he also received his Ph.D. in History in 2007.

== Career and contributions ==
McNeil is a Professor in the School of Social Policy and Society and the inaugural Stuart Hall Interdisciplinary Chair at the University of Birmingham.

Prior to joining Birmingham, McNeil was a director of the Oxford Access Scheme Summer School (2001-2), a lecturer in Black and Minority Studies at the University of Hull (2007–2010), a lecturer in Media and Cultural Studies at Newcastle University (2010–2012), and a research fellow at the Wilberforce Institute for the Study of Slavery and Emancipation.

From 2012 to 2014, he served as the Ida B. Wells-Barnett Visiting Professor at DePaul University.

McNeil has also held visiting professorships and fellowships at DePaul University, where he was the Ida B. Wells-Barnett Visiting Professor between 2012 and 2014, and the Jackman Humanities Institute at the University of Toronto, where he was the inaugural Public Humanities Faculty Fellow in 2019–2020.

In 2014 McNeil was selected as Carleton University's strategic hire in Migration and Diaspora Studies. He received two research achievement awards at Carleton and co-authored an eight-step anti-racism plan that gathered over 500 signatures from the university community.

From 2019-20, McNeil was the inaugural Public Humanities Faculty Fellow at the Jackman Humanities Institute at the University of Toronto.

McNeil is known for his work on migration, multiculturalism, and mentorship. His article, "Even Canadians Find It a Bit Boring: A Report on the Banality of Multiculturalism" (2021), was the inaugural recipient of the Editor's Award from the Canadian Journal of Communication, and he has been invited to provide advice, consultation and lectures on multiculturalism and anti-racism to the Department of Immigration, Refugees and Citizenship Canada and the Canadian Museum of Human Rights. He has also contributed to research handbooks that bring together the leading authorities on the most essential concepts, arguments, and research regarding multiculturalism from an international perspective.

McNeil is involved in public humanities projects, co-designing museum exhibitions, gallery events, and educational modules such as An Immigrant's Guide to Canada and Mapping the African Diaspora in Canada. In February 2015, McNeil delivered the Dr. Martin Luther King Jr. Intercultural Lecture at Elmhurst College titled "The Strange Eventful History of Young Soul Rebels". Between 2021 and 2025, he received three Black Excellence in Mentorship Awards from Queen's University and the Stuart Hall Outstanding Mentor Award from the Caribbean Philosophical Association.

McNeil's Thinking While Black has received reviews from scholars, curators and students of Black Studies and cognate studies of racism and racialisation. Kamari Clarke, (Note: Distinguished Professor of Transnational Justice and Sociolegal Studies, University of Toronto) David Theo Goldberg, (Note: Distinguished Professor of Comparative Literature and Anthropology, University of California, Irvine) and Lawrence Grossberg (Note: Distinguished Professor of Communication and Cultural Studies, University of North Carolina at Chapel Hill) have described Thinking While Black as an "important," "nuanced," "deeply informed," "lucid," "smart," and "wonderfully novel" analysis of the aspirations and achievements of Black Atlantic communities in the twentieth and twenty-first centuries. In her review of the book, Antonia King regarded the book as "a necessary and innovative exploration of Black culture, Black disagreement, and debate." Nicholas Rickards regarded the book as an important resource for understanding the contributions of two intellectuals, Paul Gilroy and Armond White, within the context of Black critical consciousness and popular culture.

== Publications & Media outlets ==
=== Books ===
- McNeil, Daniel. Thinking While Black: Translating the politics and popular culture of a rebel generation. Rutgers University Press, 2023.
- McNeil, Daniel. Sex and race in the Black Atlantic: Mulatto devils and multiracial messiahs. Routledge, 2010.

=== Edited ===
- Meerzon, Yana, David Dean, and Daniel McNeil, eds. Migration and Stereotypes in Performance and Culture. Palgrave Macmillan, 2020.

=== Podcasts ===
- Resonance FM: English Stitch: Stuart Hall Unpicks the Nation. What is English Culture? 10 part series (2026)
- The Black Studies Podcast, Queen's University (2022 - 2024)

== Awards ==
- Stuart Hall Outstanding Mentor Award, Caribbean Philosophical Association (2025), for fostering intellectual communities promoting liberation and dignity.
- Editor's Award, Canadian Journal of Communication (2022)
- Carleton University Research Prize (2015) for scholarly leadership and contribution to Migration and Diaspora Studies.
