= Darin Barney =

Canadian political theorist, academic and activist

- Born: Burnaby, British Columbia
- Occupations: Author, professor
- Employer: McGill University
- Known for: Information society, disruptive politics and sabotage
- Website: darinbarneyresearch.mcgill.ca

Darin Barney is a Canadian political theorist, academic and activist whose work focuses on critical theory, the philosophy of technology, infrastructure, and disruptive politics. He currently hold the Grierson Chair in Communication Studies at McGill University. In 2004, he was selected as one of fifteen "Leaders of Tomorrow" by the Partnership Group for Science and Engineering. In 2007, he delivered the Hart House Lecture at the University of Toronto, entitled "One Nation Under Google: Citizenship in the Technological Republic".

In 2010, the CBC Radio "Ideas" series featured Dr. Barney on the topic: "The Origins of the Modern Public".

In 2013, he wrote an article to defend McGill University's decision to award an honorary doctorate to American philosopher Judith Butler.

Before the Canadian election on 19 October 2015, he co-authored an article with Elyse Amend entitled: "Getting It Right: Canadian Conservatives and the "War on Science" in the Canadian Journal of Communication about the contempt of the Conservative government regarding Science.

In terms of activism, Professor Barney is invested in the divestment from fossil fuel campaign at McGill University. Divest McGill received the Catalyst prize in 2015.

== Education ==
Barney studied at Simon Fraser University for his bachelors' and master's degree, and the University of Toronto, where he received a PhD in 1999.

== Publications ==
- The Network Society. Polity Press. 2004.
- Prometheus Wired: The Hope for Democracy in the Age of Network Technology. UBC Press. 2000.
