= Carey College, Colombo =

Carey College Colombo

Location
- Borella, Colombo; Sri Lanka; 6°55′3.0864″N 79°52′15.43″E

Information
- Type: Semi Government
- Motto: Latin: Servi Et Pare (Serve and Obey)
- Established: 19 January 1914; 112 years ago
- Grades: Class 1 - 13
- Gender: Boys
- Enrollment: 4,000+
- Houses: Carey, Arthington, Spooner, Waldock
- Colors: Maroon and dark blue
- Affiliation: Baptist
- Alumni: Old Careyites
- Website: carey.edu.lk

Carey College, Colombo (also known as Carey Baptist College), is a Private school for boys in Sri Lanka. It was founded in 1914 by Baptist missionaries and offers primary and secondary education. The college started by Rev H.J Charter and one of the oldest private school in Colombo.

== Administration ==
The college which is under the Baptist Missionary Sangamaya (Society) of Ceylon, is run by a Board of Governors headed by a manager. The administration of the college itself is headed by a principal. Admission to the college is at the sole discretion of the principal.

== Overview ==
The college occupies a site located between, Ward Place and Norris Canal Road and is bounded by the Sri Lanka Army Women's Corps. to the east, various residential premises of Ward Place to the south, the Medical College Hostel to the west and Kynsey Road to the north. The college is a private institute and is headed by a principal who is assisted by a vice principal and two assistant vice principals. The college is divided into three sections : primary, secondary and upper school. The primary school is headed by a headmaster or headmistress as the case may be, while middle school and upper school are headed by sectional heads. The college educates over 3,000 children in primary and secondary education.

== Scholastic division ==
The college consists of three schools - upper, middle, and primary.

== History ==
The school was founded by the Baptist Missionary Society of England as a part of celebrating a centenary of missionary work in Ceylon. Carey College is among the few Colombo based schools which has remained in its original location from the time of inception. In 1911 the present site was acquired with the help of the Arthinton Fund which was set up by Robert Arthinton of Leeds a proponent of the Baptist Missionary Society of England. The funds were also used to construct several buildings which included the Waldock Memorial Hall named in remembrance of the late Rev. F.D. Waldock Architect and Builder of the Cinnamon Gardens Baptist Church who was also its first pastor. Finally after three years of preparation the school was established as the BMS Boy's High School, with two boys and three masters in 1914. Rev. H.J. Charter was appointed as its first principal. In 1925 it was renamed Carey Baptist College in honour of the English educator and missionary William Carey who founded the first Christian Missionaries in the East.

== The College today ==
Carey College is Sri Lanka’s only Baptist school. Its multi ethnic and multi religious student population reflects the vibrant diversity of the Sri Lankan population itself. Furthermore, the school has ensured that equal opportunities are given to all students regardless of their caste or creed, hence it has given true meaning to the concept of a multi-cultural ‘institution of learning’ and thereby has been able to overcome racial and religious divisions and unite its students as one. The school’s achievements both in the field of education as well as sports can be attributed to its equal emphasis on both these fields, its high standard of discipline and also its solid Christian foundation, traits which have also enabled the school to garner the best out of its students. Perhaps the most persistent problem the college has faced over the years has been the lack of space which has hindered its expansion. Nevertheless, various building programs have been undertaken nearly every decade with the aim of improving the school's facilities. The most notable of these were the programs of the 1960s and 1970s, spearheaded by the school’s longest serving principal Rev. Dr. W.G. Wickramasinghe who oversaw the construction the college main hall (now known as the Wickramasinghe Hall) the imposing Jubilee building which consists of the facade facing Kynsey road, and its extended wings housing administrative offices and classrooms. Mr. E. W. Wijesinghe who took office in 1994 also showed a keen interest in upgrading the facilities, his tenure saw the construction of the college gymnasium, several multi-storeyed classroom buildings and the basketball court. In 2006 the college had a student body of approximately 2,176 and a 123-member strong staff.

== Houses ==
Carey College is among the first schools in Sri Lanka to have introduced a house system. It was Rev. Spooner the school's second principal who introduced the house system in 1924. The houses were named after leaders and benefactors of the Baptist Missionary Society.

=== Arthington ===
- Colours : Purple and yellow

- Established : 1924

=== Waldock ===
- Colours : Red and black

- Established : 1924

=== Carey ===
- Colours :Blue and white

- Established: 1924

=== Spooner ===
- Colours : Yellow and green

- Established : 1951

== Sports ==
The college provides a number of sports for its students. Out of these rugby, boxing and cricket are three sports in which students have particularly excelled.

== Principals ==
- Rev. H.J. Charter - B.A. B.D. (Lond) - 1914-1921
- Rev. H. Spooner - B.D. (Lond) - 1921-1938
- Rev. H. W. Spillet - B.A. B.D. (Lond) - 1938-1944
- Rev. W.M.P. Jayatunge - B.D. (Serampore) - 1945-1954 (First Ceylonese Principal)
- Rev. Dr. W.G. Wickremasinghe - M.A.(Oxon) B.D., Dip Ed.(Cey) - 1955-1976 (First Old Boy Principal)
- J. V. Weerasinghe - B.A. (Cey) Dip Ed. (Cey) - 1976-1981
- D. W. W. Jayawardena - B.A. (Cey) Dip Ed. (Cey) - 1981-1985
- Kenneth de Lanerolle - M.A. (AJE) Dip Ed. (FRGS) - 1985-1986
- Dunstan S. Fernando - B.A. (Cey) Post Grad Ed. (Birmingham) - 1986-1989
- D. B. Welikala - B.A. (Cey) - 1990-1992
- E. W. Wijesinghe - SLEAS II. Dip Sch Mgt. - 1994-2009
- Dr. Heshan Wikramasuriya - B.Sc. M.Ed. Ph.D. - 2009-2011
- Hemamali Bibile - B.Sc. Dip Eng (Lond) - 2011–2024
- Rev. Heshan De Silva - 2024 - 2026
- Hemamali Bibile - B.Sc. Dip Eng (Lond) - 2026 February–April 2026 (Care taker Principal)
- Dr. Thomas Benjamin Jeganathan PHD - 2026 - Present

== Old Boys Union (OBU) ==
The Carey College Old Boys Union was formed in 1928 and has since been an active participant in college events and in organising various fund raising projects.

== Notable alumni ==
Past students of Carey College are referred to as Old Careyites.

Name	Notability	Reference
Douglas Meerwald	musician	
Bharatha Lakshman Premachandra	Member of Parliament - Colombo (1994–2000)	
D. Shelton A. Gunaratne	journalist, professor - Mass Communications (Minnesota State University Moorhead)	
Nisthar Cassim	journalist, editor Daily Financial Times (2009–present), editor Daily Mirror (2006–2007)	
Teddy Vidyalankara	actor, stunt coordinator	
