= Robert Boyd (director) =

Canadian film and television director

Robert Boyd is a Canadian former film and television director. His credits include the films South of Wawa and The Canadian Conspiracy, as well as episodes of Road to Avonlea and The Kids in the Hall.
