= Cell church =

Christian church structure

A cell church is a Christian church structure centering on the regular gathering of cell groups. Small group ministries are often called cell groups, but may also be called home groups, home friendship groups, home care groups, house fellowships, or life groups.

A church with cell groups is not necessarily a cell church. A cell church must be composed of cell groups and centered on them. In cell churches, a cell leader (if any) is considered to be effectively a pastor or mentor within the church.

John Wesley used a form of cell group structure which he called Class Meetings as he formed his Methodist societies into a national movement, first in Great Britain and later in the United States in the 18th century.

== Cell structure ==
There are a number of structures used to organize and coordinate multiple cells within a church.

- The G12 Vision consists of a leadership cell consisting of 12 people who each facilitate and lead their own cell group.
- The Free Market Cell Model (affinity based small groups) allows the topic or vehicle of the cell to vary (e.g., a Basketball group, Bible study, or Prayer Group), yet retains an intentional discipleship strategy. This approach is often employed to help cells take on the gifts and passions of congregation while retaining a typical cell hierarchy. (e.g., See Substance Church, Celebration Church, Seacoast Church).
- A Tree Network consists of multiple cell group leaders that report directly to a cell coordinator. Each cell coordinator manages multiple cells in this way, and several cell coordinators may be present in a single cell church. Additional levels of hierarchy may be added as well depending on the size of the cell church. While similar to a G-12 Structure, it is unrelated.

== See also ==
- Cafe church
- House church
- Pub Church
