= Substance Church =

Evangelical Christian megachurch in Minnesota, United States

Coordinates: 45°7′6″N 93°14′11″W

- Substance Church
- Location: Minneapolis-Saint Paul, Minnesota
- Country: United States, Mexico
- Denomination: Evangelical Christian
- Website: www.substancechurch.com

History
- Founded: September 2004
- Founder(s): Peter and Carolyn Haas

Architecture
- Style: Contemporary/Modern

Clergy
- Pastor: Peter Haas

Substance Church is a nondenominational, Evangelical Christian, megachurch with four campuses in the Minneapolis–Saint Paul, Minnesota area and one in Monterrey, Mexico.

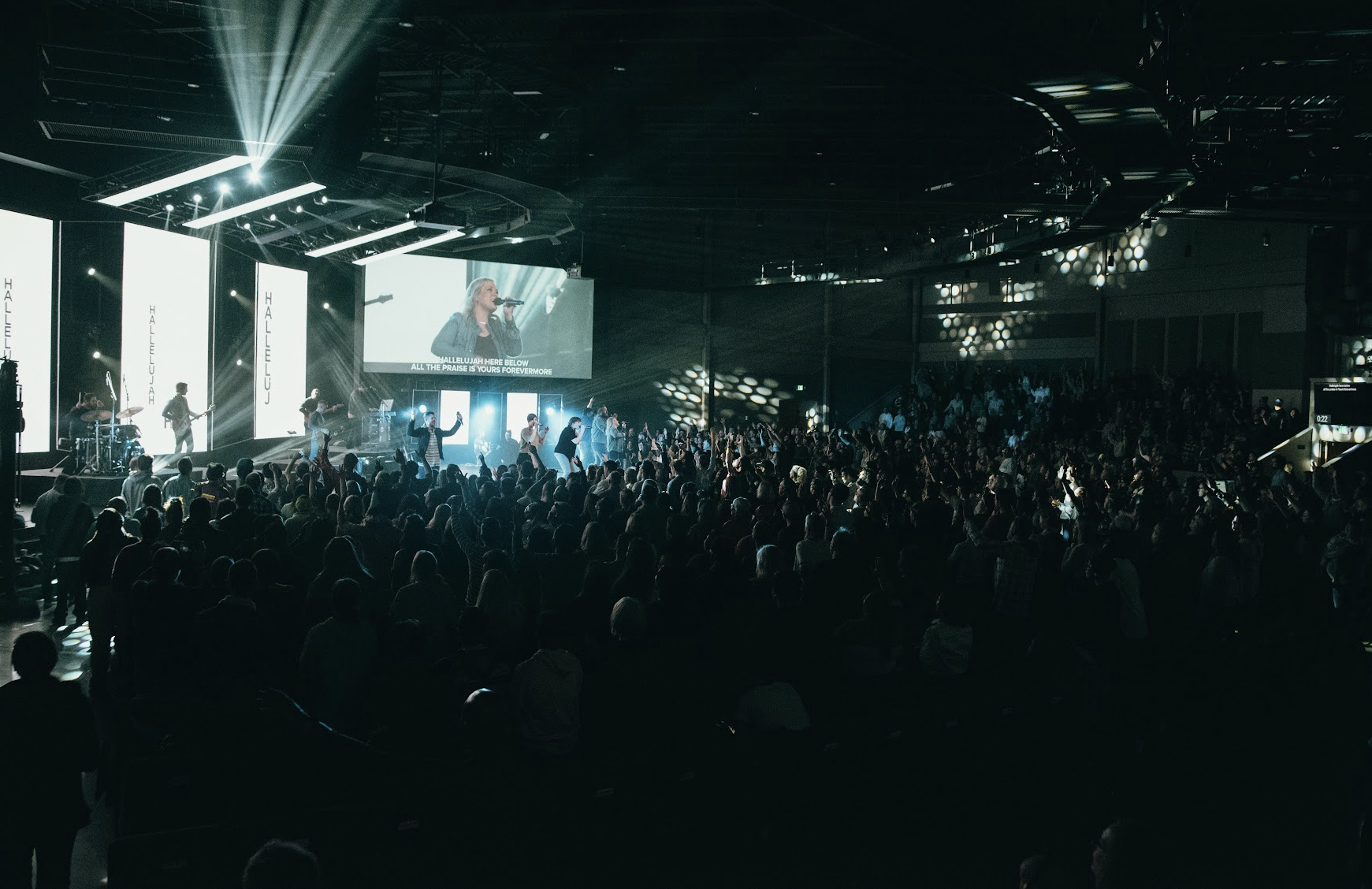
The main auditorium of Substance's Northtown campus; this is their broadcast campus.

In 2010, Outreach Magazine ranked the church as the 21st fastest growing congregation in the United States (8th in terms of growth percentages). Because the church has integrated ultra-contemporary worship, cell church, and cafe church methods into a singular megachurch setting, Substance is often cited as being "trend-setting".

== History ==
The church was founded in 2004 by Pastor Peter Haas in partnership with the Association of Related Churches. In May 2005, the church began holding Sunday services in the University of Minnesota on the Saint Paul campus. In 2015 and 2016, after numerous re-locations over the years, Substance acquired permanent facilities in Spring Lake Park and the Historic Wesley building in downtown Minneapolis, known respectively as their Northtown and Downtown campuses.

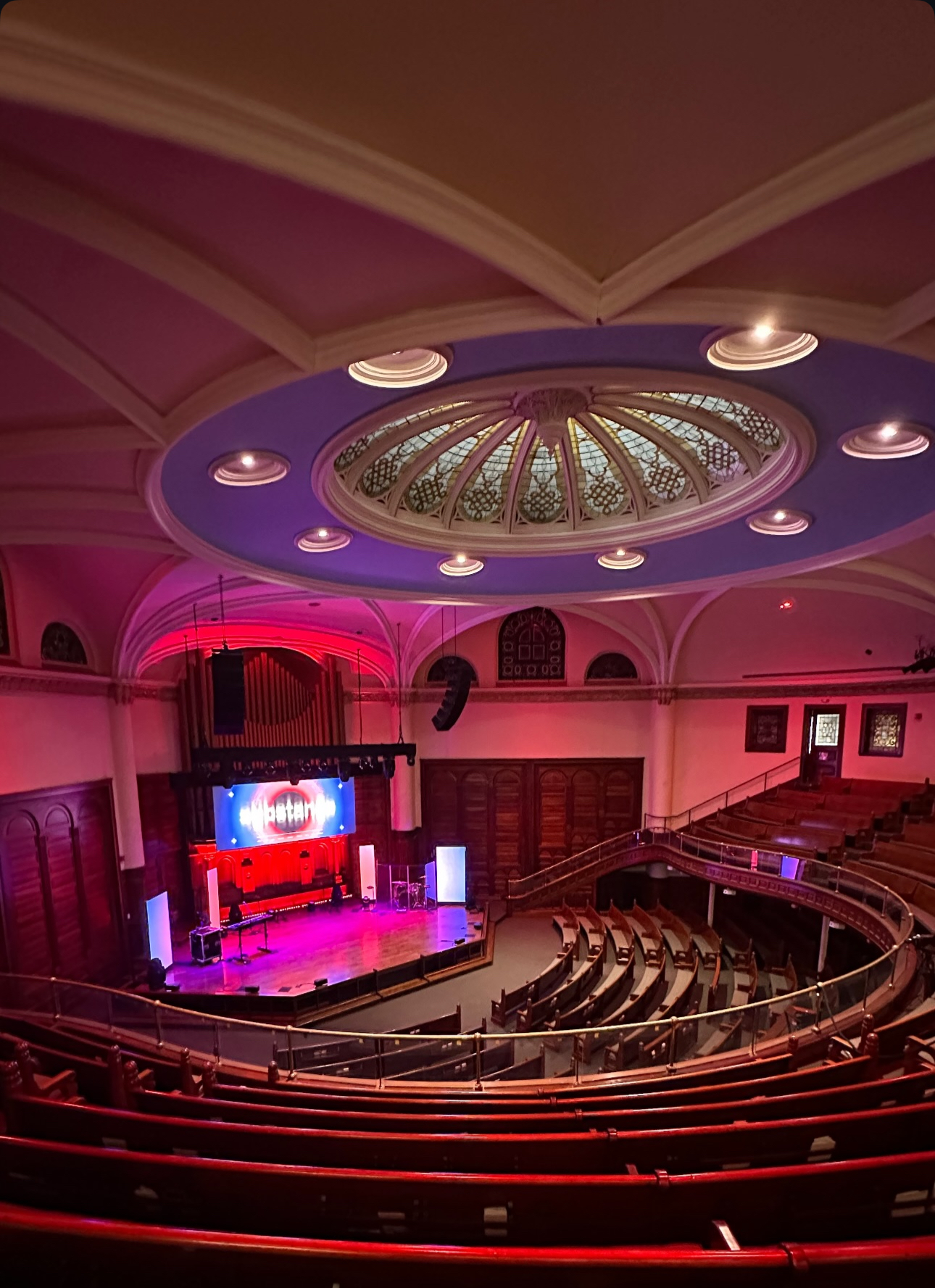
Substance Downtown Minneapolis campus at Historic Wesley

In 2025, Substance acquired the property of former Bethany Global University the original location of Bethany House Publishing, which was bought out by Baker publishing group. Shortly afterwards, they opened the Southside campus in the church on the campus; the college on the site opened as Substance College in August 2026, in partnership with Southeastern University.

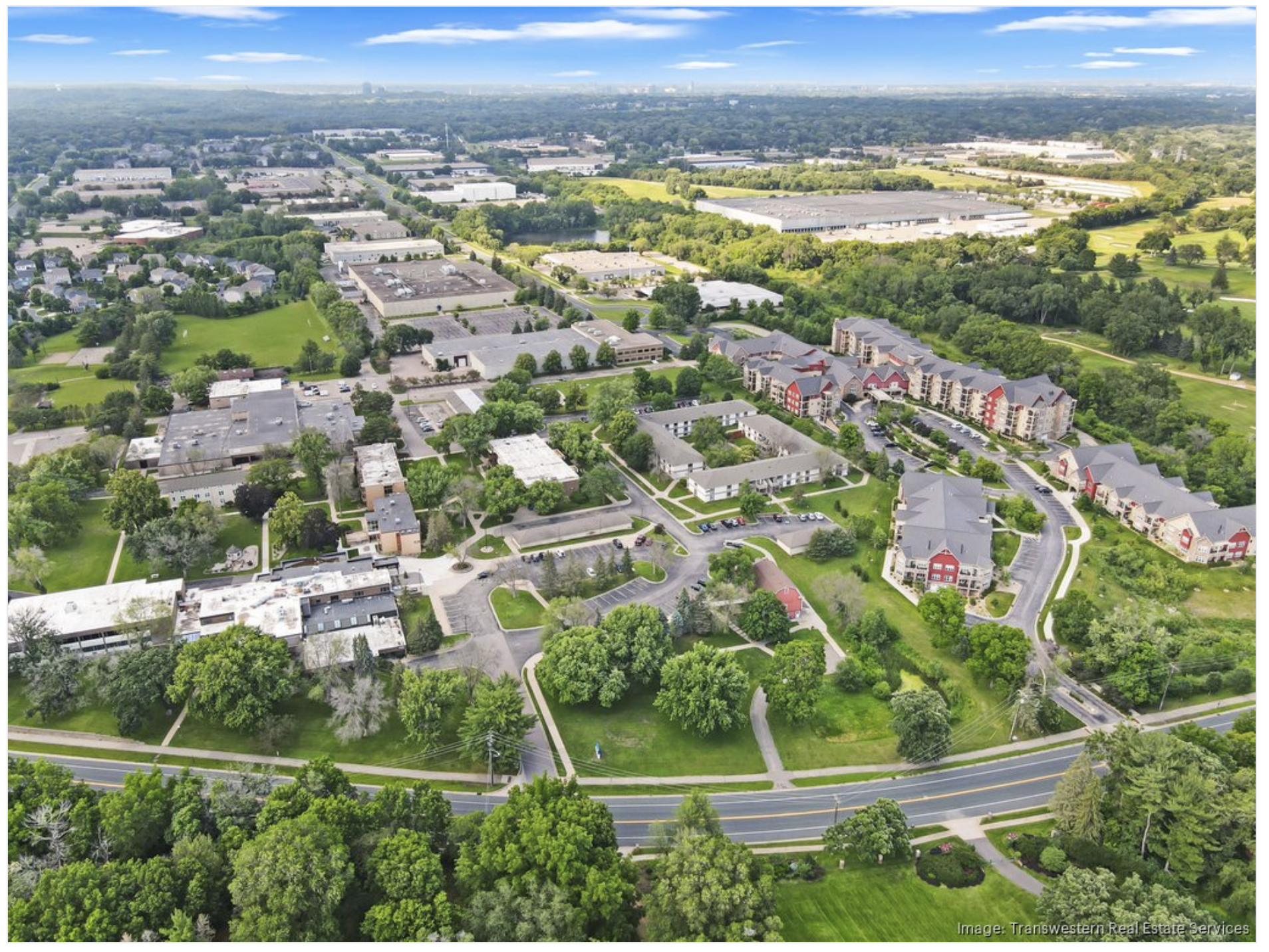
Substance's Southside campus, located on the former Bethany Global University campus; their media-arts college, Substance College, is located on the site.

As of 2026, they operate a mobile campus at the PACT Charter School in Ramsey, known as the Northwest campus, which was previously located in the Maple Grove Senior High School as their Westside campus, in addition to their permanent Northtown, Downtown, Southside, and Monterrey campuses.

== Distinctives ==
Numerous publications have called it one of the most youthful megachurches in the country with over 70% of its members under 30 years old. Substance is known for its ultra-contemporary approaches to worship utilizing turn-tables, rap, and other forms of media. They have produced dozens of music videos and album projects for their two nationally known worship bands, Substance Input-Output and their EDM DJ band, Substance Variant. Their progressive approach to church methodology applies not only to their music but their use of videography in their multi-site church format and online social networking.

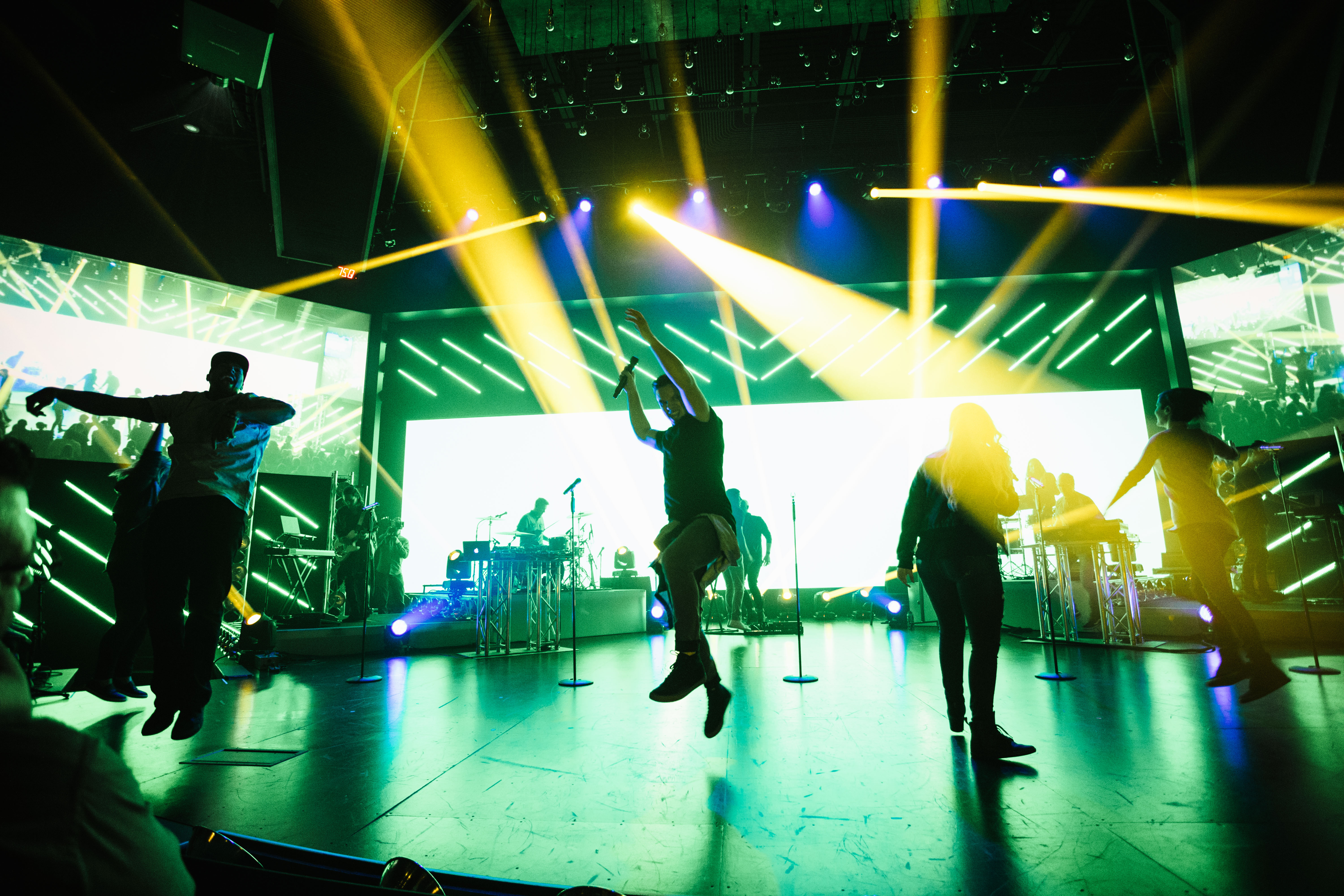
Substance Input Output worship band during their live recording

As a former progressive house DJ, its founding pastor, Peter Haas, is often cited in numerous books and publications for his conversion to Christianity in a nightclub. Pastor Peter's Amazon Best Selling humor books, Pharisectomy: How to Remove your Inner Pharisee and other Religiously Transmitted Diseases, and Broken Escalators, were originally published on the Assemblies of God imprints, Influence and Salubris. Publications also often note Substance for its approaches towards A.I. technology, governance, Cell Church methodology and regular emphasis on church planting. Substance also serves on the leadership team of the international church planting organizations, ARC Canada, ARC Europe, and ARC Southern Africa.

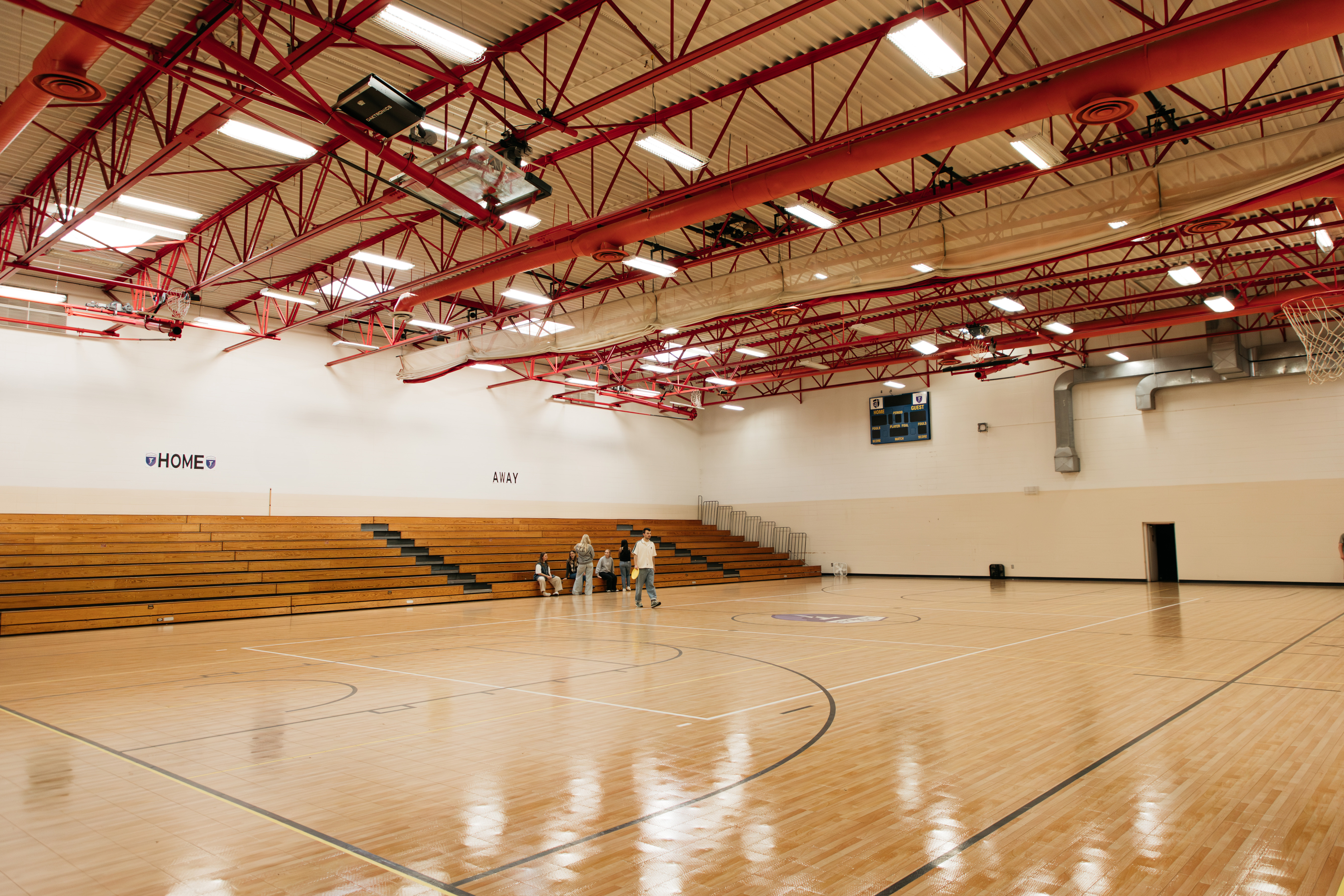
Substance Athletic center (formerly of Bethany Global University)

== Beliefs ==
Substance Church adheres to classic Evangelicalism with some Neocharismatic overtones. Although Substance does not officially classify itself as an emerging church, many articles find similarities, perhaps due to its youthful attendance. But despite their independent polity, Substance has assisted in the planting of numerous denominational and non-denominational churches ranging from Baptist to the Evangelical Covenant Church to Assemblies of God.

Substance Church does not allow its pastors, staff, or members to participate in same-sex unions or same-sex marriages.

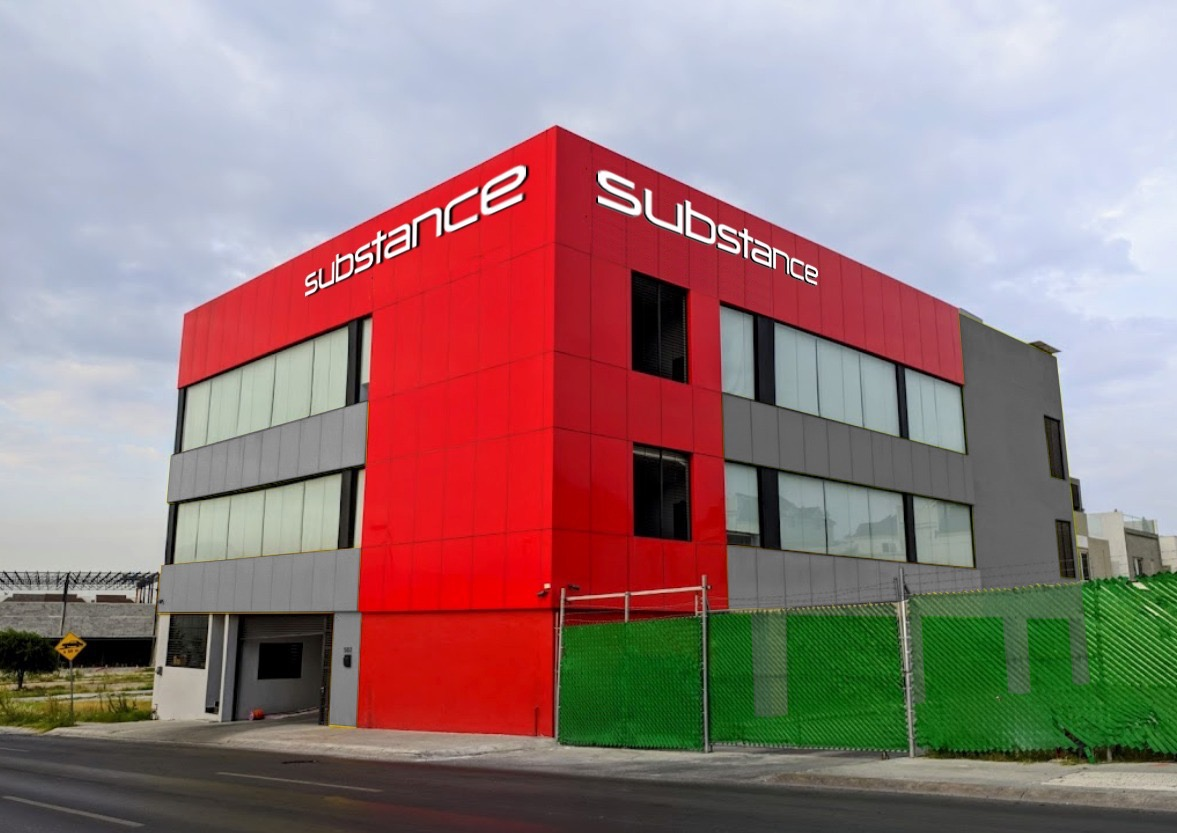
The construction picture of Substance Monterrey Mexico

== See also ==
- Multi-site church
- Cell Church
- Emerging Church
- Church Planting
