= Canadian Communication Association =

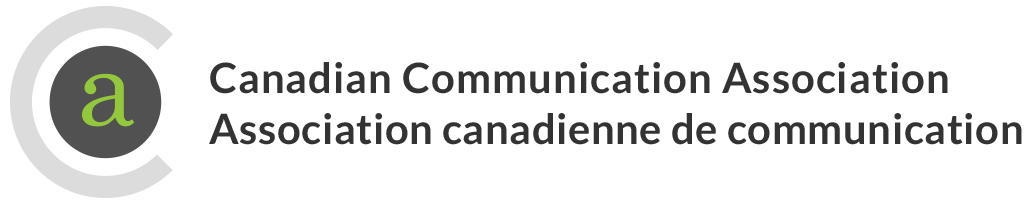
- Association logo as of 2015
- Formation: 1979
- Official language: English, French
- Website: www.acc-cca.ca

The Canadian Communication Association (CCA; or Association canadienne de communication ACC in French) is a national, bilingual association of communications researchers, educators, and private and public sector professionals in Canada. Established in 1979, the CCA/ACC "seeks to advance communication research and studies in the belief that a better understanding of communication is crucial to building a vibrant society."

== History ==
=== 1970s ===
The creation of the CCA has been considered to be due in part to research that emerged out of the Ontario Royal Commission on Violence in the Communications Industry (LaMarsh Commission) of 1976. This commission drew together a number of scholars who later met at a conference in the University of Windsor in 1978 and again in 1979 in Philadelphia where the presentations tended to focus on research that came out of the commission. In this same year, the CCA was established on June 1, 1979 during the Learned Societies Conference (now the Congress of the Humanities and Social Sciences) in Saskatoon, Canada. The pre-existing Canadian Journal of Communication was voted to be the official journal of the association. However, discussions over this arrangement led to the absence of any legally binding relationship between the two. The journal exists independently of the association and is owned by its subscribers.

=== 1980s ===
Part of the activities of the CCA in its early years was to address the combination of unique Canadian perspectives and the burgeoning theories on the nature and definition of communication. Advancing the debate, especially at early CCA meetings and conferences were "pioneers of Canadian communication studies" including: Earle Beattie, William Gilsdorf, Garth Jowett, Annie Mear, William Melody, Walter Romanow, Paul Rutherford, Liora Salter, Eugene Tate, James R. Taylor, Gaëtan Tremblay, Gertrude Robinson and others. Indeed, "[t]he politics of the Canadian Communication Association was grounded in the search for an answer to the very definition of communication." The creation of the CCA and has been described as a part of the larger trend to establish the interdisciplinary field of communication as part of emergent scholarly, professional, and corporate activities in the twentieth century.

=== 1990s ===
In the early 1990s, news and discussion about the association was communicated by an electronic mailing list called CCANet. In the later half of the 1990s, the Association for the Study of Canadian Radio and Television (ASCRT) / Association des études sur la radio-télévision canadienne (AERTC) ended its term as an association and merged with the CCA due to a lack of interest from young scholars.

== Structure ==
=== Current ===
The executive governance structure for 2022-2024 is as follows:

- Ghislain Thibault - President
- Faiza Hirji - Vice-President
- Tamara Shepherd - Treasurer
- Liam Young - Secretary

=== Past Presidents ===
- 2020-2022: Tanner Mirrlees
- 2018-2020: Mary Francoli
- 2016-2018: Daniel J. Paré
- 2014-2016: Penelope Ironstone
- 2012-2014: Colette Brin
- 2010-2012: Darin Barney
- 2008-2010: Dale Bradley
- 2006-2008: Rebecca Sullivan
- 2004-2006: Leslie Regan Shade
- 2002-2004: Sheryl Hamilton
- 2000-2002: Paul Attallah
- 1999-2000: Will Straw
- 1998-1999: David Taras
- 1997-1998: Marc Raboy
- 1996-1997: Ghislaine Guérard
- 1995-1996: David Mitchell
- 1994-1995: Denis Bachand
- 1993-1994: James Linton
- 1992-1993: James R. Taylor
- 1991-1992: Alison Beale
- 1990-1991: William Gilsdorf
- 1989-1990: Florian Sauvageau
- 1988-1989: Jay Weston
- 1987-1988: Liora Salter
- 1985-1986: Gail Valaskakis
- 1984-1985: Roger de la Garde
- 1983-1984: Fred Fletcher
- 1982-1983: William Leiss
- 1981-1982: Gertrude J. Robinson
- 1980-1981: Gaetan Tremblay

== Annual conference ==
The conference is normally held during the Canadian Federation for the Humanities and Social Sciences Congress, a gathering of scholarly associations from across the country. This typically takes place between late-May to early-June at a Canadian university.

== Association awards ==
- The Gertrude J. Robinson Book Prize was initiated by David Taras, president of the CCA in 1998-1999 and is named in honour of Gertrude J. Robinson.
- CRTC Prize for Excellence in Policy Research, a co-sponsored prize between the CCA and the Canadian Radio-television and Telecommunications Commission.
- CCA Outstanding Paper Prize, previously known as the Van Horne Prize (prior to 2010) and Beaverbrook/McGill (from 2010 to 2019), is awarded to the best student paper submitted to the annual CCA annual conference.
