= Nisthar Cassim =

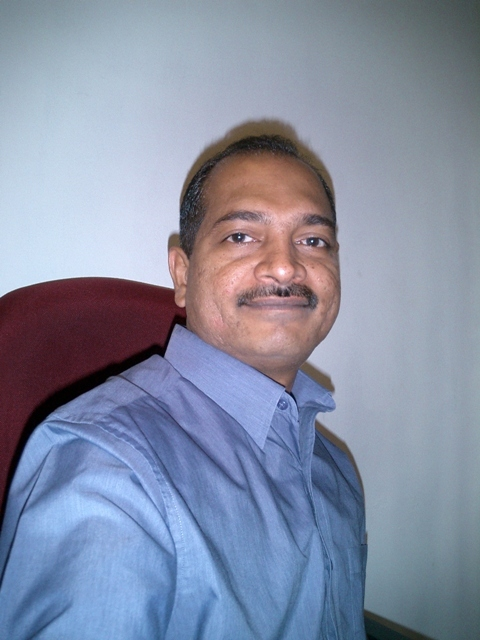
- Born: 1967 (age 58–59); Sri Lanka
- Occupations: Business Journalist (Editor in Chief), Media Personality
- Website: http://www.ft.lk

Nisthar Cassim is a senior journalist and the editor of the Daily FT in Sri Lanka, a national English-language daily newspaper focusing business, finance and economic issues.

He was formerly the editor of The Daily Mirror and The Bottom Line.

== Early years ==
Born on August 8, 1967, as the fifth child to Lafir and Huzaima Cassim in a family of six children, Nisthar started his education at Carey College, Colombo.

While in Carey College, he captained the cricket teams in all age groups but lost the opportunity of heading the under -19 team as he moved on to Wesley College, Colombo for higher studies.

== Journalist ==
Nisthar joined “Sun” newspaper at the age of 21 to start his journalism career.

== Posts held ==
- 1988 - Sun Newspaper of “Dawasa” Newspaper Group - Trade & Shipping
- 1991 - The Island Newspaper of Upali Group - overseeing the business pages, commenced the shipping segment
- 1992–1994 - handling overall media for Sri Lanka Expo 1992 & Expo 1994
- 1995 – director-publicity of Federation of Chambers of Commerce & Industry of Sri Lanka
- 1996/97 - business development manager - Expo International Singapore
- 1997-July - Daily News - business section
- 1999 July - 2005/6 deputy editor Business Daily Mirror, Wijeya Newspapers Ltd
- 2006 March - July 2007 - editor-in-chief Daily Mirror, Wijeya Newspapers Ltd
- 2007 August to 2009 October - managing editor, The Bottom Line, Rivira Media Corporation
- 2009 October to date, editor, Daily Financial Times (Daily FT), Wijeya Newspapers Ltd

== Awards and honours ==
- The first ‘Business Journalist Of The Year’ award by the Editors’ Guild Of Sri Lanka.
- Honoured with a ‘Global Commerce Excellence‘ Medal at the “Global Commerce Excellence Awards” held on December 13, 2011

== The Daily FT ==
Daily FT, or the Daily Financial Times, a daily business newspaper published in Colombo, Sri Lanka, by Wijeya Newspapers Ltd, is the biggest milestone in Cassim's career. He has served as editor from its inception.
