= D. Shelton A. Gunaratne =

Professor of mass communications (1940–2019)

Dhavalasri Shelton Abeywickreme Gunaratne
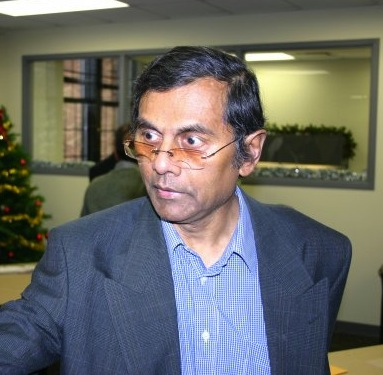
- Village Boy to Global Citizen
- Born: 22 January 1940; Weligama, Sri Lanka
- Died: 8 March 2019 (aged 79); Moorhead, Minnesota, U.S
- Education: Ananda College; University of Ceylon; University of Oregon (M.A.); University of Minnesota (Ph.D.)
- Spouse: Yoke-Sim Gunaratne
- Children: Junius Asela, Carmel Maya
- Parent(s): D. William A. Gunaratne and K. V. Ariyawathie
- Awards: Fellow of World Press Society 1967; Macmillan Fellowship for Dissertation Research 1971; ICA Best Article Award 2003
- Website: Unavailable

Dhavalasri Shelton Abeywickreme Gunaratne (Sinhala: ධවලෂ්‍රි ෂෙල්ටන් අබේවික්‍රම ගුණරත්න; 22 January 1940 – 8 March 2019) was a professor of mass communications emeritus affiliated with Minnesota State University Moorhead.

== Background ==
Gunaratne, a journalist turned mass communication scholar, was born in the village of Pathegama [1] in Weligama, Sri Lanka [2].

After completing his high school education at Carey College and Ananda College, he gained admission to the University of Ceylon in 1958. His teachers included H. A. De S Gunasekara, A. D. V. de S. Indraratne, F. R. Jayasuriya, and A. J. Wilson.

Soon after leaving the university in 1962, he joined the Associated Newspapers of Ceylon Ltd. (Lake House), where he served as a journalist for five years. He left Ceylon in 1966 on a one-year fellowship offered by the World Press Institute of Saint Paul, Minn.

Gunaratne attended the University of Oregon, where he got his M.A. in journalism in 1968. The University of Minnesota awarded him a PhD in journalism and mass communication in 1972.

Gunaratne taught journalism in four countries: Australia, China, Malaysia, and the United States, where he settled and became a U.S. citizen. Being an inveterate traveler, Gunaratne has devoted an entire volume of his autobiographical trilogy to his travels [3].

== Scholarship ==
Gunaratne has blended Eastern philosophy [9, 10], modern physics, and systems approaches [5, 16, 17], including Immanuel Wallerstein's world-systems analysis [18, 22, 28, 29, 31], James Miller's living systems theory [5], Fritjof Capra's theory of living systems [5, 9], and Ilya Prigogine's dissipative structures theory [18] to introduce new theoretical frameworks that can enrich (mass) communication research [13, 15, 22, 24, 31]. Late in his academic life, around the turn of this century, Gunaratne turned away from reliance on West-centric communication studies and turned his attention on Eastern philosophies to derive communication concepts and theory [9, 10].

=== Re-emphasis on Eastern philosophies ===
Gunaratne's principal contribution to de-Westernizing communication studies was his path-breaking book, "The Dao of the Press: A Humanocentric Theory" (Cresskill, NJ: Hampton Press, 2005) [9]. In this book, he attempted to merge Eastern and Western philosophical tenets to derive a humancentric theory of the press to demonstrate the potential of an inclusive framework of diversity (the yin-yang bifurcations) within unity (the ineluctable Dao). He has argued that the classical Four Theories of the Press has fallen into shambles because it failed to follow the path of "horizontally integrative macro-historical analysis" [30].

Clifford Christians (2011) wrote that while physicist Capra (in his book The Tao of Physics) established parallels between quantum science and Eastern philosophies, Gunaratne (in The Dao of the Press) has opened up the way for a "humanocentric theory of journalism". Christians (2011: p. 732) said:

[Gunaratne] integrates Western epistemology with Eastern mysticism to replace the media's individualism and self-interest with interdependence and mutual causality. Instead of grounding our theories of communication in politics or economics or machines, Gunaratne appeals to the human instead. In order that Eurocentrism and universalism are not de facto understood as one and the same, living systems for him is the integrating idea.

Christians implicitly endorsed Gunaratne's choice of Daoism as a radically human philosophy that could meet the challenge of preventing "the totalizing closure of our humanity into technique".

In a Q&A interview that Eric Loo (2004) conducted, Gunaratne explained how the adoption of the Daoist wu wei (action through inaction) model could result in a healthier form of journalism that reflects a multiplicity of views:

We reach the level of wuwei [which is also known as the Pooh Way] when we learn to work with the natural laws operating around us [following] ... the principle of minimal effort (p.217). [But] we have to concede that the Pooh Way is not the only way. We have to see the virtues of Winnie-the-Pooh in relation to the ways of its buddies—Rabbit, Tigger, Eeyore, and the Piglet (p. 219).

Gunaratne's contemporary writings, particularly the essay titled "Go East, young 'man' ..." [10], advocate the conceptualization of communication theory by placing the building blocks of Buddhist phenomenology on the Daoist yin-yang ontology. Responses to this essay by Rakow (2013) and by Waisboard (2013); clearly indicate that a substantial interest remains in the continuing debate over de-Westernizing communication studies. Gunaratne argues that Daoism and Buddhism converge remarkably well on agreeing that human suffering or discontent is primarily a consequence of desire (for wealth), attachment, feelings and doggedly held opinions.

The Dao of the Press has been cited in almost 50 scholarly publications, including the following:

Asante, Miike & Yin (2014); Chen (2006); Christians (2008, 2011); Featherstone (2007); Fourie (2008, 2010); Ganguly (2012); Loo (2004); McQuail (2010); Murthy (2011, 2012); Pearson (2013); Pennington (2012); Servaes (2009); Shao, Xiao, Yao & Shen (2011); and Zelizer (2011).

=== Interrogating Habermas ===
Another of Gunaratne's key publications aimed at de-Westernizing communication studies was his 2005 "Public Sphere and Communicative Rationality: Interrogating Habermas's Eurocentrism" [7]. In it, Gunaratne makes the case for a revision of Jürgen Habermas's theory to remove its lingering traces of "universalism" that promote domination through globalization—a euphemism for Eurocentric hegemony as the world moved from theory to practice.

From Gunaratne's point of view, Eastern philosophy had much to offer to enrich Habermas's notion of communicative rationality. For example, both Buddhist and Chinese philosophy recognized the validity claim of rightness (conventional truth) derived through social consensus. If Habermas were to concede this point, his theory would become more acceptable to non-Europe.

This monograph has been cited by more than 20 scholars, including Dolber (2011); Galily, Tamir & Muchtar (2012); El-Nawawy & Khamis (2009); Hove (2007); Kinane (2007); Miike (2007); Min (2009); Rauch (2007); Tran, Mahmood, Du & Khrapavitski (2011); and Weischenberg (2012).

=== Other pitfalls of West-centrism ===
Gunaratne has advocated de-Westernizing science [4, 9, 11, 15, 31] because its primary emblem, the Cartesian–Newtonian paradigm [25, 26], is based upon questionable Western epistemology, which (a) condones Newtonian reductionism—the tendency to study parts without the context of the whole; (b) fails to capture the nonlinear interactions of relevant factors that engender particular outcomes; and (c) erroneously associates science with objectivity based on the Cartesian belief that the mind and body are independent. He agrees with Wallerstein that science is the smartest Trojan horse used by the West to perpetuate European universalism, when its attempt to do so through Orientalism [12] in the humanities failed.

Gunaratne exhorts the Asian communication scholars to assume a leading role in transforming European universalism to universal universalism in the social sciences by delving into their axial Eastern philosophies [4,10], which the West downgraded as regressive to justify Western colonialism and imperialism. In a 2008 article he wrote for the inaugural issue of Communication, Culture & Critique [15], he pointed out the potential of two paradigms extracted from Eastern philosophy: the Buddhist paticca-samuppada (dependent co-arising) paradigm, and the Chinese Yijing (Book of Changes) paradigm. Theory and research based on these two paradigms entail greater complexity and realism because they enable the understanding of dynamic processes the outcomes of which cannot be predicted through covering laws as claimed by Newtonian science [25. 26]. The understanding of these processes, however, enables the actors involved to alter their actions on the expectation of counter-actions by their alter egos.

In a 2007 article published in China Media Research [20], Gunaratne demonstrated how the Chinese yin-yang model [22] could be deployed to explicate global freedom of the press. This model presumes that everything has its complement/opposite (just as quantum physics asserts that every particle has an anti-particle). Therefore, libertarianism (in governance or in media freedom) must co-exist with authoritarianism in a continuum. The push and pull of these two forces determine global media freedom, as well as that of each nation-state. Gunaratne asserts that this continuum takes a spiral form because it recognizes the possibility of quantum jumps from libertarianism to authoritarianism or vice versa following coups or revolutions. It also recognizes governance and freedom as dynamic processes without the bias of Western ideology.

=== Path breaking and leading works ===
Gunaratne's critique on West-centrism has paved the way for many Indian scholars to look afresh at the Indian media curriculum currently followed in Indian universities. Gunaratne thought that the Indian media education had just been content with the teaching and aping the Western models of communication and media theories. The paper of Murthy (2012) published in Asia Pacific Media Educator has extensively quoted the works of Gunaratne, many of which have been cited below under § Works focusing on non-Western scholarship.

The way Gunaratne related Buddhist philosophy to the possible practices in print journalism was path breaking. Though some scholars from India had found similar convergence between Indian ethos and Gandhian journalism earlier, those works did not go beyond superficial theorization but Gunaratne has first demonstrated how to scientifically correlate the Buddhist philosophical principles with the media principles of practice such as objective reporting.

The comparison of Buddhist philosophical principles with Daoist philosophy, as done by Gunaratne, offered new insights to authors (like Murthy who engaged in comparing them with other tales in trying to hammer out a new model of communication akin to Vladimir Proppian model) to look at several other works of Buddhism such as the Tripitaka in which a number of tales offer excellent vistas in comparison with Western communication models. Murthy stated that Gunaratne's work will go a long way in so far discovering the richest wealth of communication principles, practices, theories and models that lie in store in the Asian philosophical repertoire, especially Indian.

== Creative works ==
=== Autobiographical trilogy ===
The following three books explicate (a) his upbringing in a rural community in the South, (b) his life as a student, journalist, and college professor, and (c) his life as a traveler.

1. Gunaratne, S. A. (Arcadius). (2012). Village Life in the Forties: Memories of a Sri Lankan Expatriate. Bloomington, IN: iUniverse. ISBN 978-1-47593-957-6

2. Gunaratne, S. A. (2012). From Village Boy to Global Citizen: The Life Journey of a Journalist (Vol. 1). Bloomington, IN: Xlibris. ISBN 978-1477142400

3. Gunaratne, S. A. (2012). From Village Boy to Global Citizen: The Travels of a Journalist (Vol.2). Bloomington, IN: Xlibris. ISBN 978-1-47714-239-4

=== Works focusing on non-Western scholarship ===
==== Books, book chapters, monographs ====
4. Gunaratne, S. A. Pearson M & Senarath S. (Eds.) (2015). "Mindful Journalism and Media Ethics in the Digital Era: A Buddhist Approach". New York & London: Routledge.

5. Gunaratne, S. A. (2011). Emerging global divides in media and communication theory: European universalism versus non-Western reactions. pp. 28–49 in Georgette Wang, ed., De-Westernizing Communication Research: Altering Questions and Changing Frameworks. London: Routledge.

6. Gunaratne, S. A. (2009). International communication and living system theory: Using LST model to determine IC focus and research frame. pp. 36–70 in J.G. Golan, T.J. Johnson & W. Wanta, eds. International Media Communication in a Global Age. London: Routledge.

7. Gunaratne, S. A. (2009). Asian communication theory. pp. 47–52 in S. W. Littlejohn & K. A. Foss (Eds.), Encyclopedia of Communication Theory (Vol. 1). Thousand Oaks, CA: Sage.

8. Gunaratne, S. A. (2006). Public Sphere and Communicative Rationality: Interrogating Habermas's Eurocentrism. Journalism & Communication Monographs, 8 (2).

9. Gunaratne, S. A. (2006). Democracy, journalism and systems: Perspectives from East and West. pp. 1–24 in Hao Xiaoming & Sunanda K. Datta-Ray (eds.). Issues and Challenges in Asian Journalism. Singapore: Marshall Cavendish.

10. Gunaratne, S. A. (2005). The Dao of the Press: A Humanocentric [sic] Theory. Cresskill, NJ: Hampton Press. ISBN 1-57273-616-X or 1-5727-3617-8.

==== Journal articles ====
11. Gunaratne, S. A. (2015). Journalism Educators should Blame Themselves for Creating 'Bastard' Problem within the Academy. Asia Pacific Media Educator. 25 (1): 98–105.

12. Gunaratne, S. A. (2015). Globalizing communication/journalism, ending fragmentation within philosophy, and analyzing history as life-spans in samsara. International Communication Gazette. 77 (5): 411–438.

13. Gunaratne, S. A. (2013). Go East young 'man': Seek wisdom from Laozi and Buddha on how to metatheorize mediatization. Journal of Multicultural Discourses, 8: 165–181.

14. Gunaratne, S. A. (2010). De-Westernizing communication/social science research: Opportunities and limitations. Media, Culture & Society, 32 (3) 473–500.

15. Gunaratne, S. A. (2009). Emerging global divides in media and communication theory: European universalism versus non-Western reactions, Asian Journal of Communication 19 (4): 366, doi:10.1080/01292980903293247.

16. Gunaratne, S. A. (2009). Globalization: A Non-Western Perspective: The Bias of Social Science/Communication Oligopoly. Communication, Culture & Critique 2: 60, doi:10.1111/j.1753-9137.2008.01029.

17. Gunaratne, S. A. (2009). Buddhist Goals of Journalism and the News Paradigm. Javnost—the Public 16 (2): 61–75.

18. Gunaratne, S. A. (2008). Falsifying Two Asian Paradigms and De-Westernizing Science. Communication, Culture & Critique 1: 72, doi:10.1111/j.1753-9137.2007.00008.

19. Gunaratne, S. A. (2008). Understanding systems theory: Transition from equilibrium to entropy. Asian Journal of Communication 18 (3): 175, doi:10.1080/01292980802207033.

20. Gunaratne, S. A. (2007). Systems approaches and communication research. The age of entropy. Communications: The European Journal of Communication Research 32, doi:10.1515/COMMUN.2007.004.

21. Gunaratne, S. A. (2007). World-system as a dissipative structure. Journal of International Communication 13: 11, doi:10.1080/13216597.2007.9674706.

22. Gunaratne, S. A. (2007). A systems view of 'international' communication, its scope and limitations. Global Media and Communication 3 (3): 267, doi:10.1177/17427665070030030105.

23. Gunaratne, S, A. (2007). Let many journalists bloom: Cosmology, Orientalism, and freedom. In Y. Miike and G-M Chen (Eds.), Asian contributions to communication theory (special issue). China Media Research 3 (4) 60–73.[8].

24. Gunaratne, S. A. (2007). A Buddhist view of journalism: Emphasis on mutual interdependence. Communication for Development and Social Change, 1 (3) 17–38.

25. Gunaratne, S. A. (2006). A Yijing View of World-System and Democracy. Journal of Chinese Philosophy 33 (2): 191. doi:10.1111/j.1540-6253.2006.00348.

26. Gunaratne, S. A. (2005). Asian philosophies and authoritarian press practice: A remarkable contradiction. Javnost—the Public, 12 (2), 23–38.

27. Gunaratne, S. A. (2005). Public Diplomacy, Global Communication and World Order: An Analysis Based on Theory of Living Systems. Current Sociology 53 (5): 749, doi:10.1177/0011392105055014.

28. Gunaratne, S.A. (2004). Thank you Newton, welcome Prigogine: 'Unthinking' old paradigms and embracing new directions—Part 2 The pragmatics. Communications: The European Journal of Communication Research, 29 (1), 113–132.

29. Gunaratne, S. A. (2003). Thank you Newton, welcome Prigogine: 'Unthinking' old paradigms and embracing new directions—Part 1 Theoretical distinctions. Communications: The European Journal of Communication Research, 28 (4): 435–455.

30. Gunaratne, S. A. (2003). Proto-Indo-European expansion, rise of English, and the international language order: A humanocentric [sic] analysis. International Journal of the Sociology of Language, No.164, 1–32.

31. Gunaratne, S. A. (2002). An evolving triadic world: A theoretical framework for global communication research. Journal of World-Systems Research, 8 (3), 329–365.

32. Gunaratne, S. A. (2002). Freedom of the press: A world system perspective. Gazette, 64(4), 343–369.

33. Gunaratne, S. A. (2001). Paper, printing and the printing press: A horizontally integrative macro history analysis. Gazette. 63 (6), 459–479.

34. Gunaratne, S. A. (2001). Prospects and limitations of world system theory for media analysis: The case of the Middle East and North Africa. Gazette, 63 (2&3), 121–148.

=== Traditional scholarship ===
==== Books, book chapters, monographs ====
35. Gunaratne, S. A. (2003). Press freedom and development in Asia. In D.H. Johnson, ed., Encyclopedia of International Media and Communication. San Diego: Academic Press.

36. Gunaratne, S. A. (2003). Status of media in Pakistan and Bangladesh. In D.H. Johnson, ed., Encyclopedia of International Media and Communication. San Diego: Academic Press.

37. Gunaratne, S. A. (2001). Handbook of the Media in Asia. New Delhi: SAGE Publications. [Editor of the book and co-author of chapters on Bangladesh, Pakistan, Sri Lanka, Indonesia, Malaysia, Mongolia and North Korea].

38. Gunaratne, S. A. (2001). Convergence: Informatization, world system and developing countries. In W. B. Gudykunst, ed., Communication Yearbook 25 (pp. 153–199). Mahwah, NJ: Lawrence Erlbaum Associates (for International Communication Association).

39. Gunaratne, S. A. (1998). Old wine in a new bottle: Public journalism, developmental journalism, and social responsibility. In M. E. Roloff, ed., Communication Yearbook 21. Thousand Oaks, CA: SAGE (for International Communication Association).

40. Gunaratne, S. A. (1996). New thinking on journalism and news puts emphasis on democratic values. In Z. Bajka and J. Mikulowski-Pomorski, eds. Valeriana: Essays on Human Communication (pp. 182–197). Kraków, Poland: Osrodek Badan Prasoznawczych.1996.

41. Gunaratne, S. A. (1990). Media subservience and developmental journalism. In L. John Martin and Ray Eldon Hiebert, eds. Current Issues in International Communication (pp. 352–354). New York: Longman. 1990.

42. Gunaratne, S. A., & Andrew Conteh (1988). Global Communication and Dependency: Links between the NIEO and NWICO Demands and the Withdrawals from UNESCO. Moorhead, Minn.: Moorhead State University Press. 1988.

43. Gunaratne, S. A. (1982). Sri Lanka. In J. A. Lent, ed. Newspapers in Asia: Contemporary Trends and Problems (pp. 506 – 535). Hong Kong: Heinemann Asia.

44. Gunaratne, S. A. (1978). Sri Lanka. In J. A. Lent, ed. Broadcasting in Asia and the Pacific: A Continental Survey of Radio and Television (pp. 260 – 272). Philadelphia: Temple University Press.

45. Gunaratne, S. A. (1976). Modernization and Knowledge: A Study of Four Ceylonese Villages (Amic Communication Monograph Series 2). Singapore: Amic.

46. Gunaratne, S. A. (1975). The Taming of the Press in Sri Lanka (Journalism Monograph No. 39). Lexington, Ky.: AEJ.

==== Journal articles ====
47. Gunaratne, S. A. (1999). The media in Asia: An overview. Gazette, 61 (3&4), 197–223. [Guest editor of the volume].

48. Gunaratne, S. A. (1997). Small is beautiful: Informatization potential of three Indian Ocean Rim countries. [collaborators: Mohd. Safar Hasim & Roukaya Kasenally]. Media Asia, 24/4: 188–205.

49. Gunaratne, S. A. (1997). Sri Lanka and the Third Communication Revolution. Media Asia, 24/2: 83–89.

50. Gunaratne, S. A. (1996) Integration of Internet resources into curriculum and instruction . [collaborator: Byung Lee]. Journalism & Mass Communication Educator, 51/2:25-35.

51. Gunaratne, S. A. (1996). Social responsibility theory revisited: A comparative study of public journalism and developmental journalism. [collaborator: M. Safar Hasim], Javnost—the Public, 3/3 (1996): 97–107.

52. Gunaratne, S. A. (1996). Old wine in a new bottle: Public journalism movement in the United States and the erstwhile NWICO debate. Asia Pacific Media Educator, 1/1: 64–75.

53. Gunaratne, S. A. (1995). Books on global communication become a philosophical tussle between the right and the left. Media Development, 42/2: 44–47. [Buku tentang komunikasi sejagat menjadi pertarungan falsafah antara pihak yang berfaham kanan dan kiri. Bahasa Melayu Trans. M. Safar Hasim], Jurnal Komunikasi, 11: 125–136.

54. Gunaratne, S. A. (1995). Review of Treading Different Paths: Informatization in Asian Nations, edited by Georgette Wang. Media Development, 42/4: 58–60.

55. Gunaratne, S. A. (1994). U.S. and U.K. Re-entry into UNESCO (October 1995?): A Reportorial Description and a Theoretical Analysis. Jurnal Komunikasi 10:99–122.

56. Gunaratne, S. A. (1994). Review of Framing South Asian Transformation: An Examination of Regional Views on South Asian Cooperation by Naren Chitty. Asian Journal of Communication 4(2):143–148.

57. Gunaratne, S. A. (1993). Unesco must recover its universality. Media Development 40(2): 41–43.

58. Gunaratne, S. A. (1993). Roundtable: News organizations are slow to fess up to their own mistakes. Media Asia 20 (3):151; 180.

59. Gunaratne, S. A. (1992). Impact of news values on reporting death, sickness and suffering. Media Development 39(4):11–13.

60. Gunaratne, S. A. (1991) Asian approaches to communication theory. Media Development 38(1): 53–55.

61. Gunaratne, S. A. (1990). UNESCO a nowy lad informacyjny. Zeszyty Prasoznawcze 31(2–4): 99–112.

62. Gunaratne, S. A. (1987). Facts and fallacies on the withdrawals from Unesco. Australian Journalism Review 8(1&2): 65–82, 144.

63. Gunaratne, S. A. (1985). Uwagi na temat nowego swiatowego ladu informacji. Zeszyty Prasoznawcze 26(1): 67–70.

64. Gunaratne, S. A. (1983). Freedom of information: A guide for journalists. Australian Journalism Review 5(1): 59–63.

65. Gunaratne, S. A. (1982). Reporting the Third World in the 1970s: a longitudinal content analysis of two Australian dailies, Gazette, 29 (1):15–29.

66. Gunaratne, S. A. (1979). Journalism teaching: public affairs reporting, precision journalism and specialisms. Australian Journalism Review 2 (1): 4–10.

67. Gunaratne, S. A. (1979). Media subservience and developmental journalism. Combroad No.43: 22–27.

68. Gunaratne, S. A. (1978). The background to the non-aligned newspool [sic]. Gazette 24 (1): 20–35.

69. Gunaratne, S. A. (1978). Priorytety srodkow masowego kommunicowania jako czynnika rozwpjuspolecznego. Zesyty Prasoznawcze 19(4): 83–90.

70. Gunaratne, S. A. (1976). A critical look at the 'new paradigm' of communication and development. Southeast Asian Journal of Social Science 4(2): 9–20.

71. Gunaratne, S. A. (1976). Wiadomosci zagraniczne w prasie Malezji. Zesyty Prasoznawcze, 17(2):123–128.

72. Gunaratne, S. A. (1975). Some research problems in rural Sri Lanka. Media Asia 2 (3):169–171.

73. Gunaratne, S. A. (1972). Foreign news in two Asian dailies. [With Han C. Liu] Gazette 18 (1): 37–41.

74. Gunaratne, S. A. (1970). Press in Pakistan under President Ayub Khan. Gazette 16(1): 39–53.

75. Gunaratne, S. A. (1970). Government-press conflict in Ceylon: freedom versus responsibility. Journalism Quarterly 47: 530–543; 552

=== Newspaper articles ===
Since 1980, Gunaratne's feature articles on politics, population, public affairs, etc.-- most of which demonstrate the use of precision journalism techniques—have appeared in many Australian newspapers.

Since 1986, his opinion columns and travel articles have appeared in several American newspapers including St. Paul Pioneer Press Dispatch, The (Fargo, N.D.) Forum, Grand Forks (N.D.) Herald, and The (Longview, Wash.) Daily News. He also completed an internship with the Eugene (Ore.) Register-Guard in the first quarter of 1967.

He was a columnist for LankaWeb and Sri Lanka Guardian.
