= Bethany Global University =

Minnesotan private Evangelical Christian university

- Motto: Living with eternity in view
- Type: Private university
- Established: 1948
- Religious affiliation: Evangelical Christian
- Director: David Hasz
- Students: 145
- Location: Bloomington, Minnesota, United States
- Colors: Blue and White
- Website: bethanygu.edu

Bethany Global University (formally Bethany College of Missions) is a private Evangelical Christian university in Bloomington, Minnesota. Its primary focus is on training missionaries and it was founded in 1948. It was one of nine work colleges in the United States until 2024, when it moved to a fully online format. The physical campus was sold in 2025 to Substance Church.

== History ==
Bethany Global University, originated as the Bethany Fellowship Missionary Training Center in 1945 in Minneapolis, Minnesota. Its founders were five families united by a shared commitment to Christian missionary work and a desire to spread the Gospel. These families sold their possessions and combined their resources to support the formation of a missions-focused organization. Their first headquarters, "Bethany House," was located in a 30-room home in Minneapolis. The name "Bethany" was inspired by the biblical village where Jesus often retreated to pray.

== Academics ==
The institution offers educational programs with a focus on theology, ministry, and Biblical outreach. Programs include certificates, Associate of Arts, Bachelor of Arts, and master's programs. All of the university's degree programs are provided entirely online.
