= Christian Examiner (California) =

Christian news site

The Christian Examiner is an online Christian news site. Prior to July 1, 2014, it was a tabloid newspaper, published by Selah Media Group serving Southern California, Western Washington and the Minneapolis–Saint Paul metropolitan area of Minnesota. In early 2014, the newspaper ceased publishing and the trademark, URLs and website were sold to the Christian Media Corporation (CMC Group) which operates Christian Post.

In 2014, Refreshed magazine was launched to replace the Christian Examiner.
