= Gertrude J. Robinson =

Gertrude Joch Robinson (born 1927) is a Canadian communication scholar. She is emeritus professor at McGill University.

== Life ==
Gertrude Joch was born in Hamburg on November 15, 1927. Her father Frederick W. Joch was a shipowner, originally from Munich, and her mother Sarah Blaisdell was an American originally from Chicago. The family was bilingual, listened to BBC radio broadcasts, and avoided enrolling the girls in German youth organizations.

Robinson was the first director of the Communications Ph.D. program at McGill University.

Robinson was the second president of the Canadian Communication Association (in 1981–82), and the first editor of the Canadian Journal of Communication. She also served as Chair of the Association for Education in Journalism and as vice-president of the International Association for Media and Communication Research (IAMCR).

In honour of Robinson, the Canadian Communication Association established an annual Gertrude J. Robinson Book Prize in 1999.

== Works ==
=== Books ===
- Tito’s maverick media: The politics of mass communications in Yugoslavia. University of Illinois Press, 1977.
- Women, communication, and careers. Norlin, 1980.
- Gender, journalism and equity: Canadian, US and European perspectives. Hampton Press, 2005.

=== Selected articles ===
- '"Here be dragons": Problems in charting the U.S. history of communication studies'. Communication, 10, 1988, 97–119.
- 'Monopolies of knowledge in Canadian communication studies: The case of feminist approaches'. Canadian Journal of Communication, 23(1), 1998, 62–72.
