= Alex Wade =

British freelance journalist and media lawyer

Alex Wade (born 1966) is a British writer, freelance journalist and media lawyer.

== Career ==
Wade is the author of Wrecking Machine: A Tale of Real Fights and White Collars and Surf Nation: In Search of the Fast Lefts and Hollow Rights of Britain and Ireland. He has also contributed chapters to The Road Less Travelled, Seaside: Discover Britain's Best Beaches and Countryside: Discover the Best of Rural Britain (2010).

== Freelance journalist ==
Wade has written for The Times, The Sunday Times, The Independent, the Independent on Sunday, The Guardian, The Observer, The Financial Times, the Daily Telegraph and The Sun, as well as a variety of magazines such as Coast, Huck, The Surfer's Path, Wavelength, Pit Pilot, Flush, Arena and Cornwall Today.

In 2009, Wade was short-listed in the Sports Journalists' Association awards as Sports Feature Writer of the Year. Wade is also the Arts Editor for Cornwall Today magazine, itself the winner of the Press Gazette's 'Best Regional Magazine' award in 2009, and also contributes book reviews for The Times Literary Supplement.

== Media lawyer ==
Wade qualified as a solicitor with media law firm Carter-Ruck in 1994. He subsequently worked for Richard Desmond as Head of Legal Affairs as well as other legal practices. For much of his legal career, Wade also worked as a 'night lawyer' for the national press, but Wade quit all legal work save night lawyer work in 2002.
