= Canadian Journal of Communication =

Canadian academic journal

- Discipline: Communication
- Language: English

Publication details
- History: 1974–present

Standard abbreviations
- ISO 4: Can. J. Commun.

Indexing
- ISSN: 0705-3657 (print); 1499-6642 (web)

Links
- Journal homepage

The Canadian Journal of Communication publishes Canadian research and scholarship in the field of communication studies, first published in 1974.

"In pursuing this objective, particular attention is paid to research that has a distinctive Canadian flavour by virtue of choice of topic or by drawing on the legacy of Canadian theory and research. The purview of the journal is the entire field of communication studies as practised in Canada or with relevance to Canada." It is an independent journal and is owned by its subscribers.
