= St Cross College, Oxford =

College of the University of Oxford

St Cross College
- University of Oxford
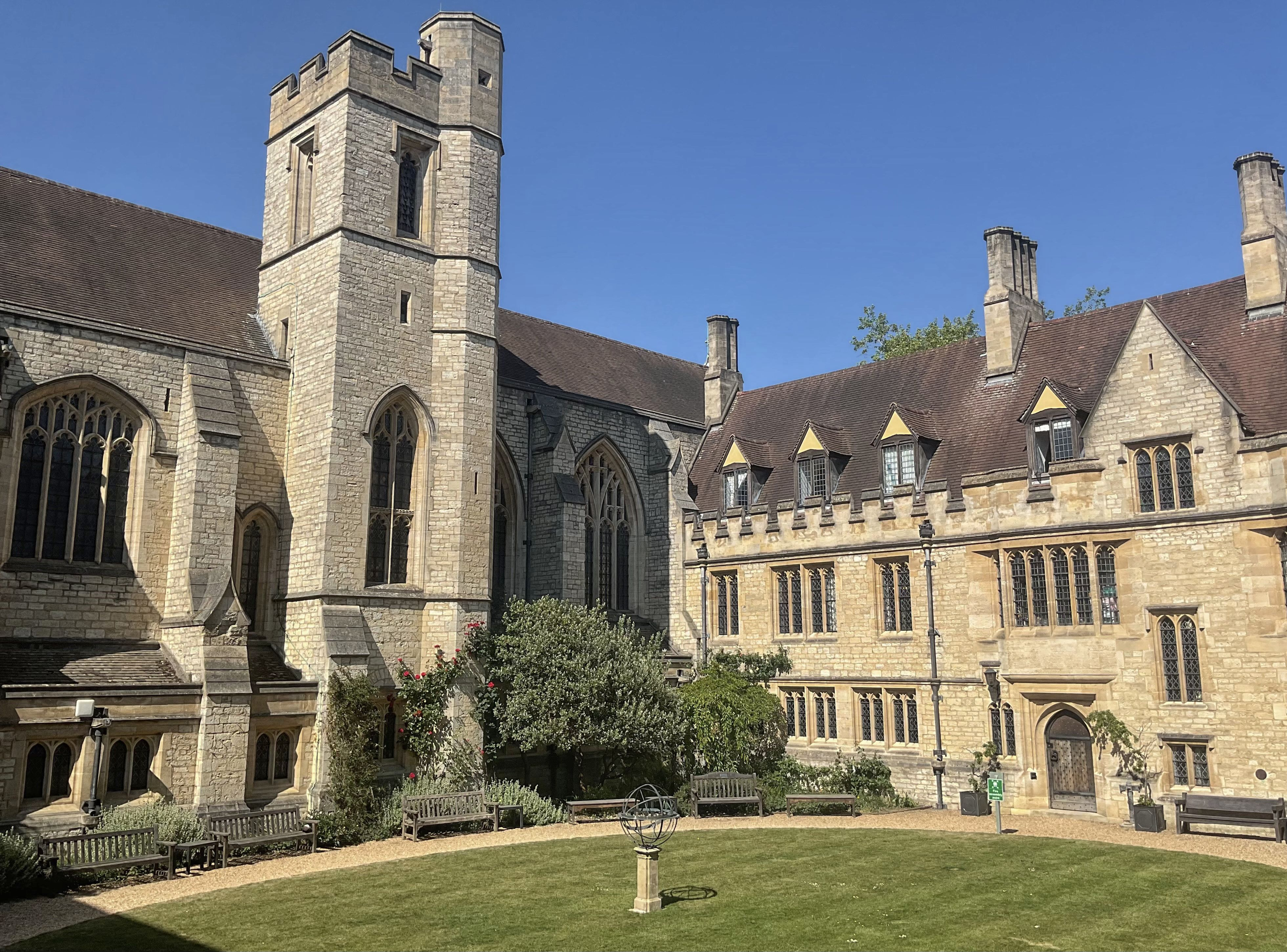
- Richard Blackwell Quad, St Cross College

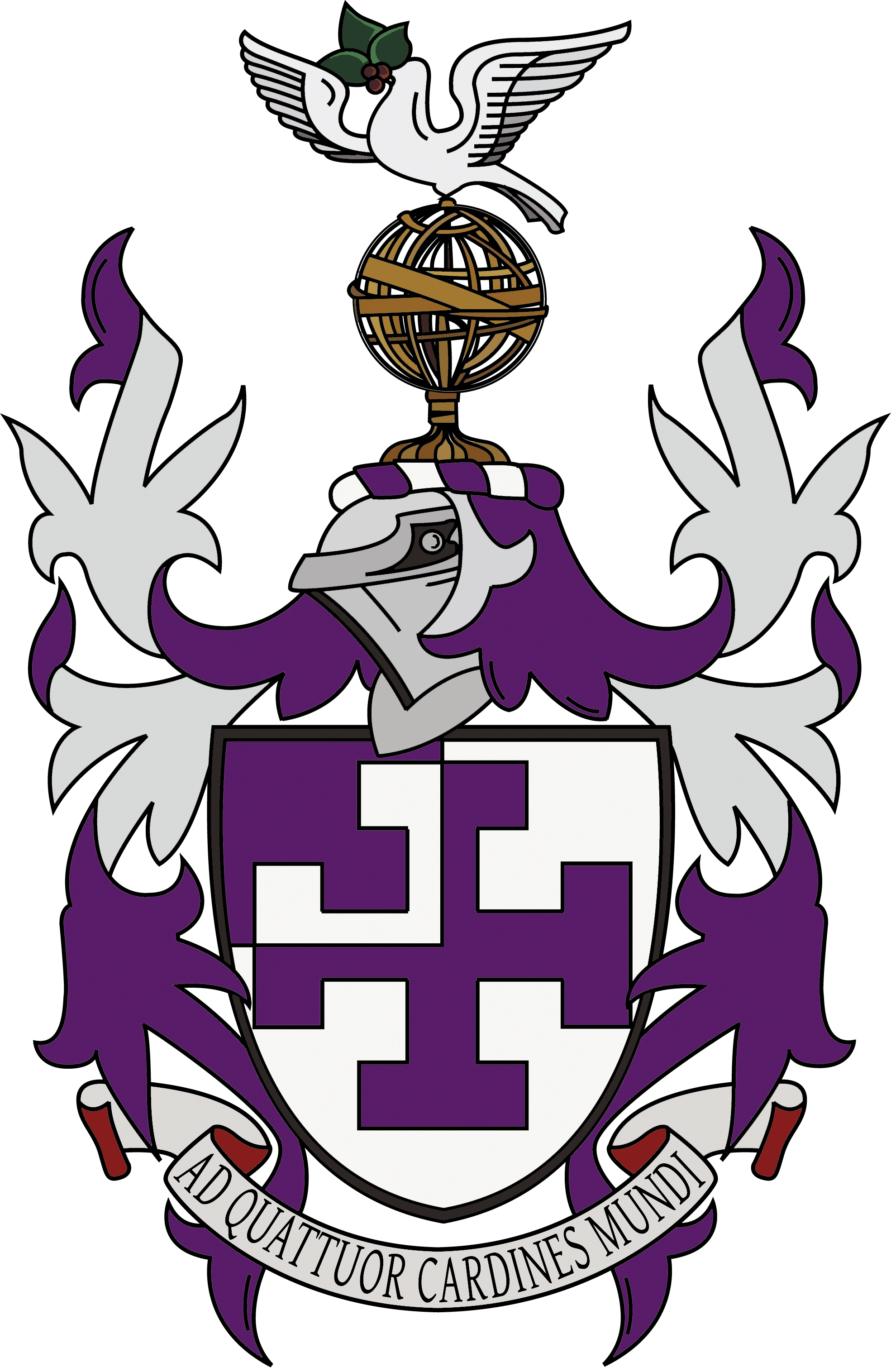
- Arms: Argent a Cross Potent Purpure a Quarter counterchanged; and for the Crest upon a Helm with a Wreath Argent and Purpure an Armillary Sphere upon a Stand Or thereon a Dove with wings elevated and displayed Argent holding in the beak a Sprig of Mulberry fructed and leaved proper mantled Purpure doubled Argent
- Location: St Giles'
- Coordinates: 51.756528°N 1.260311°W
- Latin name: Collegium Sanctae Crucis
- Motto: Ad quattuor cardines mundi
- Motto in English: To the four corners of the earth
- Established: 1965
- Named for: St Cross Road and St Cross Church
- Sister college: Clare Hall, Cambridge
- Master: Kate Mavor
- Dean: Heather Hamill
- Undergraduates: 0
- Postgraduates: 545 (2018)
- Visitor: The Lord Mance as High Steward of the University of Oxford
- Website: www.stx.ox.ac.uk
- Boat club: Boat Club shared with Wolfson College Boat Club

Map
- Location within Oxford city centre

St Cross College, also known as StX, is a constituent college of the University of Oxford in England. Founded in 1965, St Cross is a graduate college with gothic and traditional-style buildings on a central site in St Giles', just south of Pusey Street. It aims to match the structure, life and support of undergraduate colleges.

== History ==
St Cross College was formally set up as a society by the University on 5 October 1965; it was to admit its first graduate students (five in number) in the following year. Like most newer Oxford colleges, St Cross has been co-educational since its foundation.

The early location of St Cross was on a site in St Cross Road, immediately south of St Cross Church. The college took its name from its proximity to these places. In 1976 negotiations began between the college and the members of Pusey House over the possibility of moving the college to the St Giles site. The negotiations were successful and in 1981 the college moved from St Cross Road into a site owned by Pusey House on 999-year lease. The old site on St Cross Road continued to be used, initially by the Centre for Islamic Studies (at that time an Associated Centre of the college), and then subsequently in the early 1990s the site was developed by the college in collaboration with Brasenose College. The site now houses two residential buildings, which were opened in 1996.

On 18 November 2010, it was announced that Sir Mark Jones, previously director of the Victoria and Albert Museum, had been elected as the next master of the college; he took up the post in September 2011. The master of St Cross is not appointed by the college's governing body, unlike every other college head (except Kellogg and Reuben), but by the University Council. Therefore, the election has only the character of a recommendation to Council, albeit one which is always followed.

In May 2016, it was announced that the Fellows of St Cross College had elected Carole Souter, then chief executive of the National Heritage Memorial Fund and Heritage Lottery Fund, as the next master of the college, from September 2016. In June 2022 it was announced that Souter would retire in September 2022. In 2023, Kate Mavor was announced as the new master of the college, with effect from September 2023.

== Buildings ==
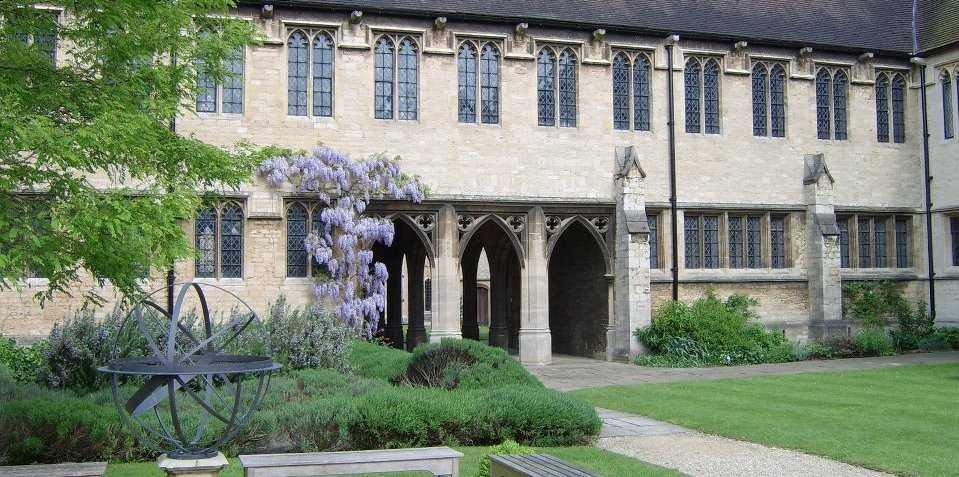
The Blackwell Quad towards the library

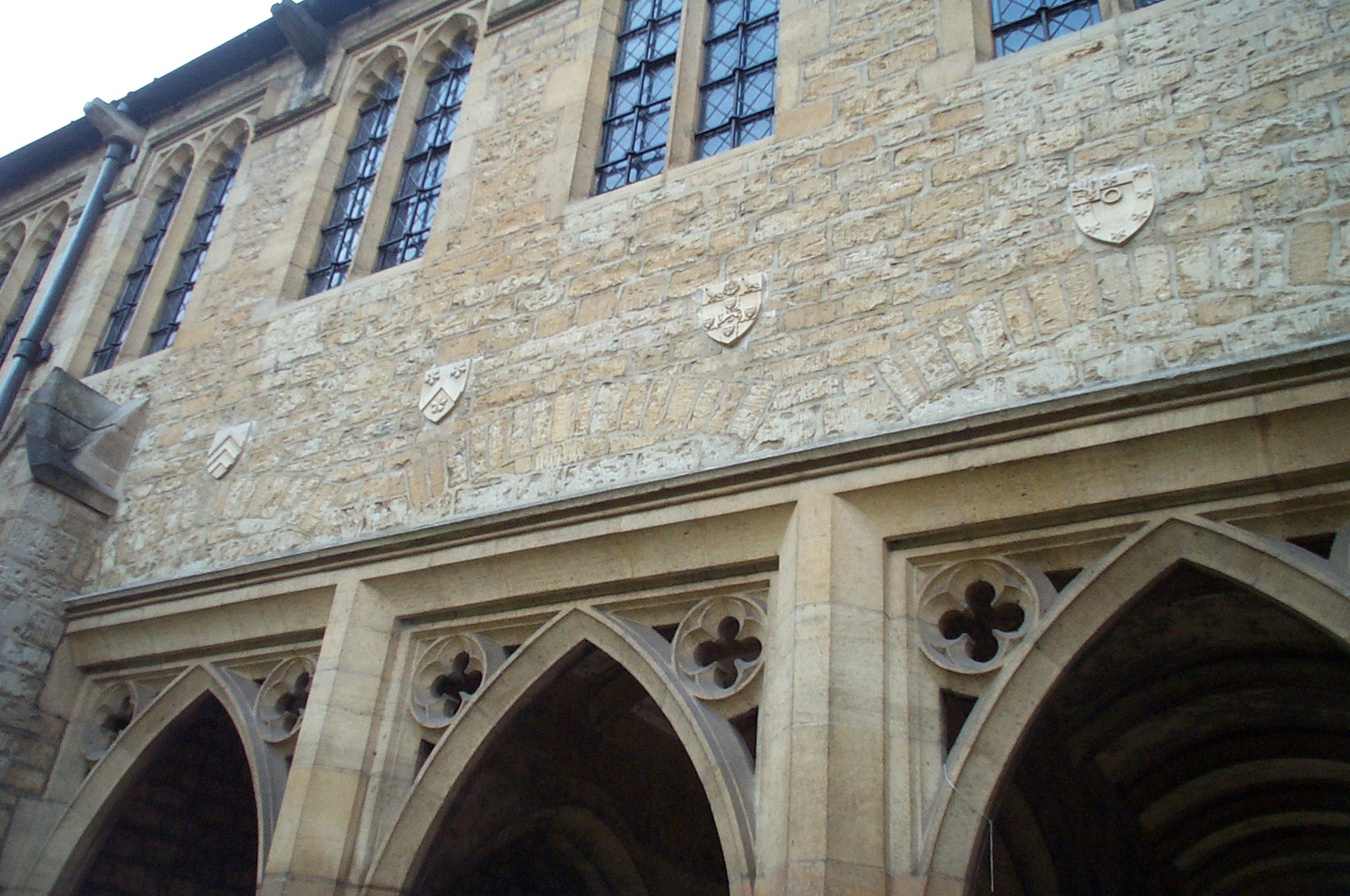
The Four Colleges Arch with reliefs of the coats-of-arms, from left to right, of the colleges Merton, All Souls, Christ Church, and St John's

The college is located on St Giles' near to the Ashmolean Museum, south of Regent's Park College and immediately north of Blackfriars, and faces St John's College. It is close to the Classics Faculty and the Oriental Institute.

The college buildings are structured around two quads, the Richard Blackwell Quadrangle and the new West Quad. St Cross shares the site with Pusey House, which comprises the first floor and parts of the ground floor to the eastern side of the Blackwell quad, a library on the first floor on its western side, as well as the chapel. The original Pusey House buildings around the Blackwell quad, including the chapel, date from the period of 1884 to 1926 and are mainly the work of the architects Temple and Leslie Moore and Ninian Comper. Discreet internal alterations were made when St Cross moved in by Geoffrey Beard and the Oxford Architects Partnership. Among these was the conversion of a cloister and store rooms into the Saugman Hall (now the Saugman Common Room) named after Per Saugman, a former director of Blackwell Scientific Publications and a former fellow of the college. The first quadrangle was named the Richard Blackwell Quadrangle in honour of Richard Blackwell (another former fellow); both Saugman and Blackwell played a crucial part in securing the large Blackwell benefaction for St Cross. Most students, however, used to refer to the Richard Blackwell Quadrangle by its nickname: 'the Quad'. After completion of the second quad, it is now commonly known as 'the front Quad'.

At the west side of the Blackwell Quad lies the Four Colleges Arch, named after the four colleges which had contributed especially generous capital and recurrent funding to St Cross: Merton, All Souls, Christ Church, and St John's. Behind the Four Colleges Arch originally lay a large open garden bordered by medieval boundary wall. This offered the college the possibility of expanding its buildings and erecting a second quadrangle, the West Quad.

Work was first completed on the South Wing on the southern side of the West Quad, containing a hall and kitchen, with bar, the Ian Skipper conference room, and the Caroline Miles games room below, a guest room and study bedrooms above. This development has in part been financed by Ian Skipper, Domus fellow of the college, after whom the conference room on the lower ground floor was named.

A second building to the western and northern sides of the West Quad was set to be completed in time for the college's semicentennial in 2015. However, planning permission for the new building was rejected, as it required the demolition of a medieval boundary wall, an action which the council qualified as 'unjustifiable'. Planning permission was subsequently granted following an appeal, and the new West Wing building was completed in 2017. The new West Quad includes 50 student bedrooms, a lecture theatre, a library with a garden room (the Douglas and Catherine Wigdor Library), several seminar rooms, and the Audrey Blackman Guest Room. Soon after it opened, cracks in the glassfibre reinforced concrete window surrounds appeared, which were found not to have been manufactured to specification and required quality. The building subsequently closed for replacement with a different material, and should reopen in 2023.

In addition to the current main site, the college still owns its original site on St Cross Road, located near the Law Faculty and English Faculty. After the college moved to its present location, this site was developed into student accommodation, the St Cross Annexe. The site is shared with Brasenose, who also own an annexe on the site. Additional buildings which are run by St Cross College as student accommodation include Bradmore Road House, Stonemason House, and the Wellington Square houses.

The master's lodgings are also located in Wellington Square.

== Academia ==
In 2016, St Cross had over 550 graduate students, studying for degrees in all subjects. There is a strong emphasis on international diversity, with regularly over 75% of the students coming from outside the UK (2016: 83%). This is reflected in the college motto Ad quattuor cardines mundi, meaning 'to the four corners of the earth'. The fellowship is similarly diverse and represents a broad range of academic disciplines in the sciences and the arts.

The college awards a number of scholarships in different subjects, predominantly in the humanities and social sciences.

== Student life ==
Students are admitted and matriculated according to the same admissions procedures as the other colleges and halls of the University of Oxford. Unusually for an Oxford college, there is a founding tradition of sharing social facilities between fellows, members of Pusey House, the Common Room and students, with no separate high table or Senior Common Room.

The college has a social calendar for both current students and alumni. There are a range of college societies and sports teams (often in collaboration with other colleges), as well as weekly academic seminars and annual conferences.

Some students are provided with accommodation in the first year of study. College students have the opportunity to participate in a variety of extra-curricular activities. There are sports teams in football, rowing, netball and basketball as well as opportunities to play other sports for other Oxford colleges.

The college's Boat Club shared with Wolfson College is like many other college boat clubs competes both within the university itself and in external competitions. The St Cross has a women's football team which became Cuppers Champions in 2015.

Other events in the college include regular formal hall, a feast once a term, 'bops' (informal college-based parties) and a yearly ball. St Cross was the first Oxford college to officially celebrate Chinese New Year. Reunion events for alumni are hosted by the college annually both in Oxford itself and abroad.

The Common Room also provides arts activities, such as an annual play and pantomime, as well as several social societies. The cafe/bar area is a large oak-panelled room, including leather sofas, a TV, a sound system for bi-termly parties (bops), a football table. There is also a free DVD rental library. During Trinity Term, croquet and Pimms are enjoyed on the quad.

== Administration ==
Together with Kellogg and Reuben, St Cross is one of only three Oxford colleges without a royal charter. It is officially a society of the university rather than an independent college. The main difference from an independent college is that the governing body only recommends a Master, who is then appointed by Council; in other colleges, the head of house is elected and appointed by the governing body directly. For accounting purposes, the societies are considered departments of the university. St Cross has one of the smallest endowments of any Oxford college, at approximately £25 million as of 2025. Nevertheless, the college has several scholarships that it awards to current and prospective graduate students and that are funded by third party donations and alumni.

== Traditions ==
=== Grace ===
The college grace is:

When	Latin	English
Ante cibum (before the meal)	"Adesto nobis, Domine Deus noster: et concede ut quos Sanctae Crucis laetari facis honore, ejus donis quoque salutaribus nutrias, per Dominum nostrum Jesum Christum.''	"Be present with us, O Lord our God: and grant that those whom thou makest to rejoice in the honour of the Holy Cross, thou mayest also nourish by wholesome gifts, through our Lord Jesus Christ."
Post cibum (after the meal)	'Gratias agimus tibi, Domine, pro omnibus beneficiis tuis per Dominum nostrum Jesum Christum.''	"We give thanks to thee, O Lord, for all thy favours through our Lord Jesus Christ."

=== Egalitarianism ===
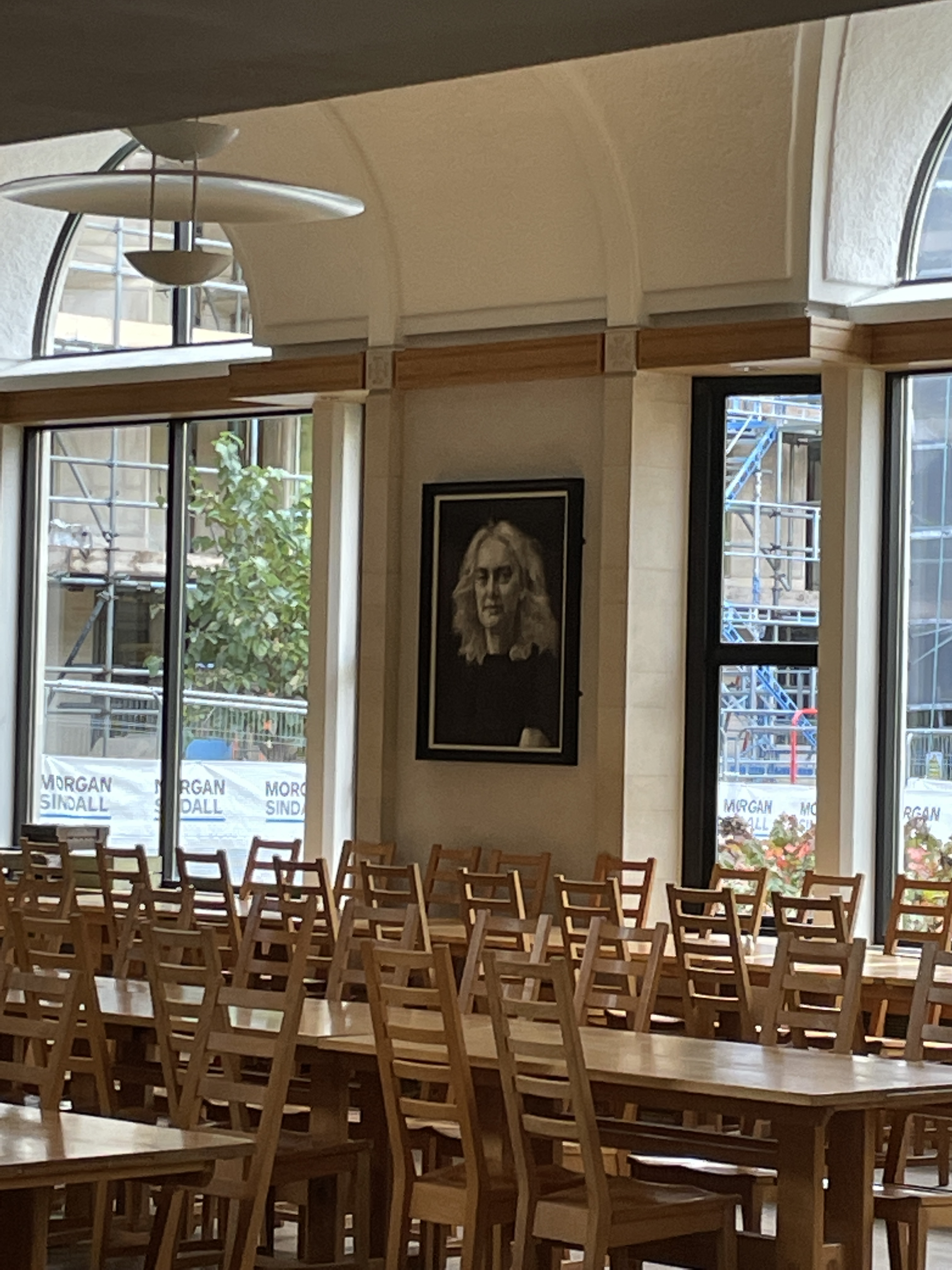
Dining hall with a drawing of Carole Souter, the college's master between 2016 and 2022

Unlike most colleges, St Cross does not divide its common rooms between senior and middle members. All facilities are open to everyone, students and fellows alike. There is no High Table in the dining hall, and, at formal meals, the Master and Fellows sit amongst the students in the dining hall (which seats 120 people across 3 long tables), with the master normally sitting at the centre of the top table.

== People associated with the college ==
=== Notable alumni ===
- Aharon Appelfeld, Israeli novelist
- Steve Baker, British politician
- Ruth Barnes, academic and curator of the Ashmolean Museum and Yale University Art Gallery
- Christian M. M. Brady, academic and dean at University of Kentucky
- Tilman Brück, director of the Stockholm International Peace Research Institute
- John Burn, geneticist
- Kurt M. Campbell, American diplomat and Assistant Secretary of State for East Asian and Pacific Affairs
- Alan Carter, professor and environmental philosopher
- Steven Casey, historian and academic
- Yusuf Çetin, Turkish religious leader
- David Chadwick, British politician
- Roger Collins, medieval and papal historian
- Lisa Downing, author and professor
- Tim Foster, Olympic rowing gold medalist
- Toshiharu Furukawa, Japanese politician, professor, and CEO
- M. G. Harris, children's author
- R. Joseph Hoffmann, religious historian and translator
- John F. Jungclaussen, journalist and author, UK correspondent Die Zeit
- John Kingman, British mathematician and fellow of the Royal Society
- Hermione Lee, Goldsmiths' Professor of English Literature, President of Wolfson College, Oxford
- Kelsey Leonard, first Native American woman to earn a degree from the University of Oxford
- Sally Mapstone, Principal and Vice-Chancellor of the University of St Andrews
- Mungo Mason, Scottish professional rugby
- Jason Gaverick Matheny, academic, co-founder of New Harvest, and United States national security professional
- Pete Mathias, musician and drummer in the band Filligar
- Sultan Muhammad V, Sultan of the Malaysian state of Kelantan and 15th Yang di-Pertuan Agong of Malaysia
- Karen O'Brien, Warden and Vice-Chancellor of Durham University
- Jonathan Orszag, American economist, politician and CEO
- Alexander Oshmyansky, American physician and entrepreneur, co-founder and CEO of Mark Cuban Cost Plus Drug Company
- David Digby Rendel, British politician
- Richard Rudgley, anthropologist, author, and television presenter
- Peter Schweizer, political writer and researcher at Stanford University
- Klaus Stierstorfer, academic and author
- Anne Ulrich, biochemist and professor at the Karlsruhe Institute of Technology
- Mihai Răzvan Ungureanu, former Prime Minister of Romania, diplomat and politician
- Douglas Wigdor, American lawyer and former Assistant District Attorney for New York
- Graham Wiggins, musician

=== Fellows ===
- Muhammad Al-A'zami
- Geoffrey Allen
- Jere L. Bacharach
- Nick Bostrom
- Mary F. Bosworth
- George Malcolm Brown
- Lorna Casselton
- Robert de Crespigny
- Paul J. Crutzen
- Colin Dexter
- Klaus Dodds
- Elizabeth Eisenstein
- Luciano Floridi
- Elizabeth Frood
- Andrew Goudie
- Robin Harrison
- Robert E. M. Hedges
- Helena Hamerow
- Dan Hicks
- Robert Hoyland
- Jack Howlett
- Peter Killworth
- Robert MacCarthy
- Diarmaid MacCulloch
- Herbert W. Marsh
- Farhan Nizami
- Arthur Norrington
- Arthur Peacocke
- James Pettifer
- Alwyn Robbins
- E. Peter Raynes
- Derek Roe
- Per Saugman
- Julian Savulescu
- Godfrey Stafford
- Mary Tregear
- Philip Wadler
- Bernard Wasserstein
- A. B. Yehoshua
- Andrew Pollard

=== Honorary Fellows ===
- Muhammad V of Kelantan, former Yang di-Pertuan Agong (King) of Malaysia
- Hermione Lee
- Arthur Lionel Pugh Norrington

=== Masters ===
- William van Heyningen, 1966–1979
- Godfrey H. Stafford, 1979–1987
- Richard C. Repp, 1987–2003
- Andrew S. Goudie, 2003–2011
- Sir Mark Jones, 2011–2016
- Carole Souter, 2016–2022
- Rana Mitter (interim), 2022–2023
- Kate Mavor, 2023–present
