= Norman J. W. Goda =

American historian (born 1961)

Norman Goda
- Born: 25 April 1961 (age 65)
- Occupations: Historian, author, editor
- Children: 2

Academic background
- Education: University of North Carolina at Chapel Hill

Academic work
- Era: 20th century
- Institutions: University of Florida; Ohio University
- Main interests: Modern European history History of international relations Intelligence operations

Norman J. W. Goda (born April 25, 1961) is an American historian specialized in the history of Nazi Germany and the Holocaust. He is a professor of history at the University of Florida, where he is the Norman and Irma Braman Professor of Holocaust Studies.

Goda is the author of several books on the international policy of Nazi Germany, the Holocaust, and the Cold War. He also serves as a historical consultant for the Nazi War Crimes and Japanese Imperial Government Records Interagency Working Group of the United States National Security Archive, tasked with reviewing the previously classified intelligence documents of World War II and its aftermath.

== Career ==
Goda is the co-author of the book U.S. Intelligence and the Nazis, which was published in 2005 by Cambridge University Press and based on materials that were declassified under the 1998 Nazi War Crimes Disclosure Act.

Reviewing the book in the journal History, the historian Steven Casey called the book "remarkable" and noted that book "sheds new light on three controversial aspects of the war and post-war period:" how much US intelligence organizations knew about the Holocaust, the crimes of individual Nazi perpetrators, and the "extent to which US intelligence knowingly collaborated with war criminals during the cold war." Casey noted:

Breitman et al. have used these [declassified documents] to write a series of measured case studies, which, unsurprisingly, confirm that many post-war exculpatory accounts by leading Nazis were highly misleading. Indeed, whereas figures such as SD Intelligence Chief Walter Schellenberg sought to depict themselves as reluctant Nazis who had tried their best to save the lives of concentration camp victims or to bring the war to a swift conclusion, the new documents confirm that they were actually ruthless individuals who not only had plenty of blood on their hands but also remained wedded if not to the Nazi cause then at least to their Nazi comrades long after May 1945.

== Political views ==
Post October 7 attacks, Goda has argued that accusations of genocide against Israel constitute a modern antisemitic blood libel, falsely portraying Jews as inherently bloodthirsty destroyers in a distortion that echoes medieval tropes while ignoring Hamas's explicit genocidal intent. Historian Omer Bartov criticized Goda for allegedly saying that it is antisemitic to show photos of dead Palestinian children. Goda also argued that mass starvation was not a problem in Gaza, and that Israel's control of the crossings into Gaza was "legitimate". In an interview with The New Yorker, Goda argued that certain widely circulated images had been staged for propaganda purposes.

In September 2026, the Creative Community for Peace published a public letter which rejected the characterization of Israel's invasion of the Gaza Strip as a genocide, in which Goda is named among its signatories.

== Bibliography ==
- Goda, Norman J. W. (1998). Tomorrow the world: Hitler, Northwest Africa, and the path toward America. Texas A & M University military history series (1st ed.). College Station: Texas A & M University Press. ISBN 978-0-89096-807-9.
- Goda, Norman J. W.; Breitman, Richard; Wolfe, Robert; Naftali, Timothy, eds. (2005), "U.S. INTELLIGENCE AND THE NAZIS", U.S. Intelligence and the Nazis, Cambridge: Cambridge University Press, pp. 1–2, ISBN 978-0-521-85268-5
- Goda, Norman J. W. (2007). Tales from Spandau: Nazi criminals and the Cold War. Cambridge; New York: Cambridge University Press. ISBN 978-0-521-86720-7.
- Kreike, Emmanuel; Jordan, William Chester (2004). Corrupt histories. Studies in comparative history. Rochester (N.Y.): University of Rochester Press. ISBN 978-1-58046-173-3.
- Goda, Norman J. W.; Bartov, Omer, eds. (2014). Jewish histories of the Holocaust: new transnational approaches. Making sense of history. New York; Oxford: Berghahn Books. ISBN 978-1-78238-441-0.
- Goda, Norman J. W. (2022). The Holocaust: Europe, the world, and the Jews, 1918-1945 (Second ed.). New York, NY: Routledge. ISBN 978-1-138-32154-0.

== Sources ==
- Casey, Steven (2006). "Review: U.S. Intelligence and the Nazis By Richard Breitman, Norman J. W. Goda, Timothy Naftali and Robert Wolfe". History. 91 (304). Wiley-Blackwell: 601−602. doi:10.1111/j.1468-229X.2006.379_27.x.
