= Dakota Ridge High School =

Location
- 13399 West Coal Mine Avenue; Dakota Ridge, Colorado 80127; United States; 39°36′15″N 105°8′59″W

Information
- School type: Public
- Motto: To Live, To Love, To Learn, To Leave a Legacy
- Established: August 20, 1996 (30 years ago)
- School district: Jefferson County Public Schools
- CEEB code: 060923
- Principal: Kim Keller
- Teaching staff: 66.12 (FTE) (as of 2023-2024)
- Grades: 9-12
- Enrollment: 1,307 (2023-2024)
- Average class size: 21
- Student to teacher ratio: 119.77(as of 2023-2024)
- Campus size: 42 acres (170,000 m^{2})
- Colors: Navy blue and cardinal
- Athletics: CHSAA 5A (football is CHSAA 4A)
- Athletics conference: Jefferson County League
- Mascot: Eagle
- Publication: The Cord News
- Yearbook: The Dakota Ridge Talon
- Website: dakotaridge.jeffcopublicschools.org

Dakota Ridge Senior High School is a public school located in Dakota Ridge, Colorado, United States. It is part of the Jefferson County Public Schools system.

== History ==
Dakota Ridge High School opened on August 20, 1996. It is named after the nearby Dakota Hogback. The school was built to ease the burden on Chatfield High School, which had so many students that it began a split schedule to accommodate all of the students. The first class graduated in the spring of 1998.

== Campus ==
Dakota Ridge operates as a closed campus for freshmen and an open campus for sophomores, juniors, and seniors.

It sits atop a hill on Coal Mine Avenue, overlooking The Meadows Golf Course to the south.

A new wing was added roughly ten years after its original opening. In 2020, Warren Tech, Jefferson County's career and technical education program, announced the plan to build a southern campus on the school's property. It opened in 2021.

== Attendance zone ==
Areas within the school's attendance zone include: Ken Caryl CDP

== Extracurricular activities ==
The school's athletic teams, known as the Dakota Ridge Eagles, compete in CHSAA class 5A in the Jefferson County League. Teams are fielded in baseball, basketball, marching band, cheerleading, cross country, football, golf, ice hockey, lacrosse, poms, soccer, softball, swimming, tennis, track and field, volleyball, and wrestling.

The 1996 football team became the first in Jefferson County history to win its inaugural Jeffco League game.

In 2007, the men's cross-country team won the State Championship. The women won in the 2008 5A state championship.

The 2012-13 cheerleading squad also brought home the League Championship for both Varsity & JV and won the CHSAA 4A/5A Coed State Championship in December 2012. The cheer squad went on to the USA Nationals Cheerleading & Dance Competition in Anaheim, California placing third in the nation. The next season (2013-2014) the Co-Ed Cheer squad took the state title for the second time in a row.

In 2025, the football team led by head coach Jeremiah Behrendsen, took home their first State Championship, defeating Palmer Ridge 38-14.

== Instrumental music and performance ==
Winter guard

The Dakota Ridge Winter Guard has competed in the Rocky Mountain Color Guard Association (RMCGA) as well as Winter Guard International (WGI), and has received two state championship titles as well as other medalist finishes in the RMCGA unit.

Percussion ensemble

The Dakota Ridge Percussion Ensemble won RMPA State Champions (gold medalists) in PSCO class in 2014, 2015, and 2016, as well as RMPA State Champions (gold medalists) in PSCA class in 2015.

In the 2016 season, the Percussion Ensemble attended the WGI 2016 world championships in Dayton Ohio, finishing as World Champions (gold medalists) in PSCO class.

== Notable alumni ==
- Jared Dillinger - professional basketball player
- Todd Dunivant - professional soccer player; Los Angeles Galaxy
- Alexander Oshmyansky - Co-founder, CEO of Mark Cuban Cost Plus Drug Company.
- Natosha Rogers - long-distance runner
- Steven Wilson - professional baseball player, San Diego Padres
