= Mark Jones (numismatist) =

British art historian, numismatist and museum director

Sir Mark Jones FSA FRSE
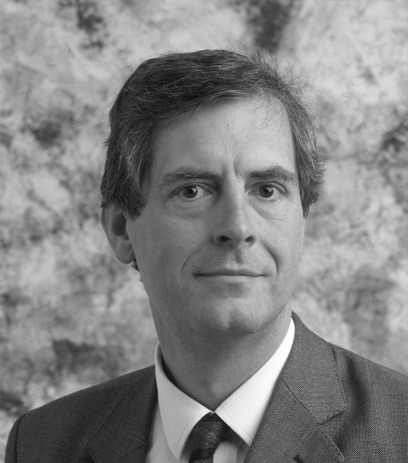

5th Master of St Cross College, Oxford
- In office September 2011 – September 2016
- Preceded by: Andrew Goudie
- Succeeded by: Carole Souter CBE

14th Director of the Victoria and Albert Museum
- In office May 2001 – September 2011
- Preceded by: Alan Borg
- Succeeded by: Martin Roth

Personal details
- Born: Mark Ellis Powell Jones; 5 February 1951 (age 75)
- Spouse: Camilla Toulmin
- Children: 4
- Education: Eton College
- Alma mater: Worcester College, Oxford; Courtauld Institute of Art
- Awards: FSA (1992); FRSE (1999); Knight Bachelor (2010)

Sir Mark Ellis Powell Jones FSA FRSE (born 5 February 1951) is a British art historian, numismatist and museum director. He was director of the Victoria and Albert Museum from 2001 to 2011, and then master of St Cross College, Oxford from 2011 to 2016.

== Early life ==
Jones was born on 5 February 1951. He is the son of John Ernest Powell-Jones (or Powell-Jones) and writer/historian, Ann Paludan, and grand nephew of actor Robert Newton. He was educated at Eton College, an all-boys public school in Eton, Berkshire.

He studied Politics, Philosophy and Economics at Worcester College, Oxford. He then undertook postgraduate studies in art history at the Courtauld Institute of Art, graduating with a Master of Arts (MA) degree.

== Career ==
Jones spent 18 years in the Department of Coins and Medals at the British Museum, where he curated the exhibition FAKE? The Art of Deception.

In 1992, he was appointed director of the National Museums of Scotland. He oversaw the creation in 1998 of the Museum of Scotland in Edinburgh, which went on to win 22 prizes for its displays and a Stirling Prize nomination for its building.

In May 2001, Jones became director of the Victoria and Albert Museum. On his first day as director, he announced the scrapping of entry charges to the museum. Under his directorship, a number of renewal projects have been completed, including the Medieval and Renaissance galleries which opened in 2009.

On 18 November 2010, it was announced that Jones had been elected as the next master of St Cross College, Oxford; he took up the post in September 2011. He retired from the post in September 2016, and was succeeded by Carole Souter.

On 2 September 2023, it was announced that Jones had been named as interim director of the British Museum.

On 23 September 2025 it was announced that Jones had been appointed the Chair of Historic Environment Scotland for a 4 year term.

Jones is Chairman of the National Museum Directors' Conference, a trustee of the National Trust, the Gilbert Collection, and the Pilgrim Trust, a member of the Court and Council of the Royal College of Art, Vice President of the British Art Medal Society and the Kensington & Chelsea Decorative & Fine Arts Society, and a patron of the Embroiderers' Guild and the Heritage Crafts Association.

== Personal life ==
He is married to Camilla Toulmin, the former director of the International Institute for Environment and Development. They have three children and Jones has a daughter from a previous marriage.

== Honours ==
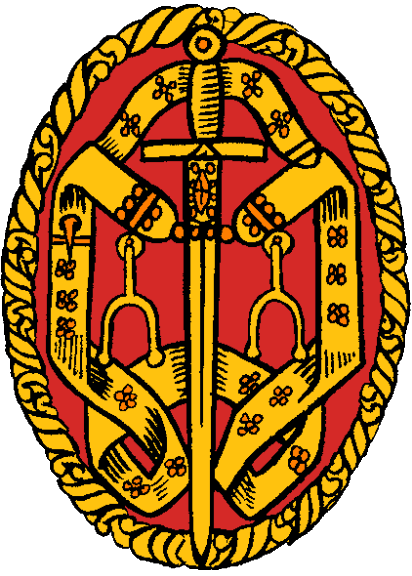
Insignia of a Knight Bachelor

- Fellow of the Society of Antiquaries of London (FSA). (7 March 1992)
- Fellow of the Royal Society of Edinburgh (FRSE). (1999)
- Knight Bachelor (2010 New Year Honours) "for services to the Arts".
- Honorary Doctorate, Royal Holloway College
- Honorary Doctorate, Dundee University
- Honorary Doctorate, University of Abertay (Dundee)
- Honorary Doctorate, University of East Anglia
