= Cost plus =

Cost plus may refer to:

- Cost Plus World Market, U.S. retail chain
- Cost-plus contract
- Cost-plus pricing
- Cost Plus Drugs
