= R. J. B. Bosworth =

Australian historian (born 1943)

R. J. B. Bosworth FAHA FASSA
- Born: 7 December 1943 (age 82); Australia
- Spouse: Michal Gwyn Newell

Academic background
- Education: University of Sydney (BA, MA); University of Cambridge (PhD)

Academic work
- Institutions: University of Oxford (2012–); University of Reading (2007-2011); University of Western Australia (1987–2011); University of Sydney (1969–86)
- Main interests: Italy; Italian Fascism
- Notable works: Mussolini (2002); Mussolini's Italy (2005)

Richard James Boon Bosworth FAHA, FASSA (7 December 1943) is an Australian historian and author, and a leading expert on Benito Mussolini and Fascist Italy, having written extensively on both topics.

Bosworth received his bachelor's and master's degrees from the University of Sydney, before going on to doctoral study at St John's College, Cambridge. He held various teaching positions at the University of Sydney, the University of Western Australia and the University of Reading. He has also held various fellowships, including fellow of the Academy of the Social Sciences in Australia, fellow of the Australian Academy of the Humanities, research fellow in the Humanities Research Centre of Australian National University and senior research fellow in history at Jesus College, Oxford.

== Personal life and education ==
Richard James Boon Bosworth was born to Richard C.L. Bosworth – himself a professor of Chemistry – and Thelma H.E. Bosworth on 7 December 1943 in Sydney, New South Wales. Bosworth married Michal Gwyn Newell on 23 September 1965. They have two children: Edmund and Mary, the latter a professor of criminology at St. Cross College, Oxford. In the same year, Bosworth completed a Bachelor of Arts at the University of Sydney, graduating with first-class honours. In 1971, Bosworth earned a PhD at the University of Cambridge.

== Career ==
Bosworth began his lecturing career in 1969 at the University of Sydney. He became a senior lecturer in 1974 and associate professor of history from 1981 to 1986.

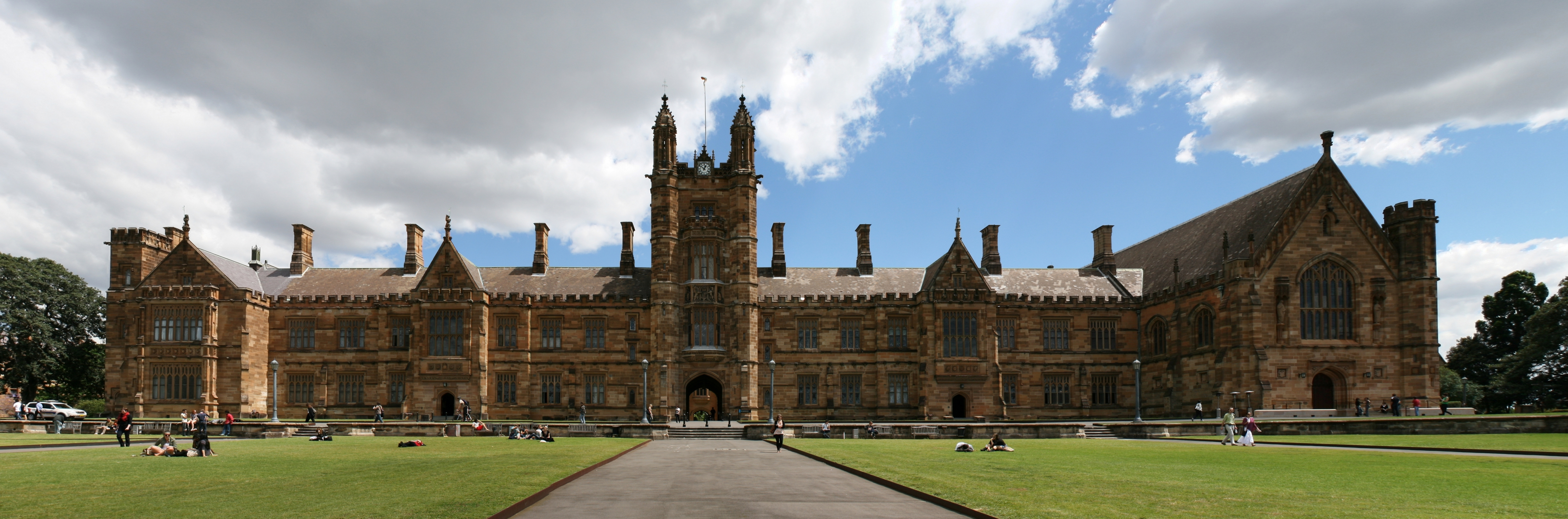
The University of Sydney, where Bosworth spent the bulk of his time as a student and an academic

Promoted to professor of history at the University of Western Australia in 1987, Bosworth was head of department from 1988 to 1990. In 2007, he began working part-time there and part-time at the University of Reading. In 2012, Bosworth became a senior research fellow in history at Jesus College, Oxford. He is known as an "eminent scholar of Italian Fascism".

Bosworth was deputy or acting director of the Frederick May Foundation for Italian Studies from 1981 to 1986. He also worked as a research fellow in the Humanities Research Centre of Australian National University in 1991, visiting overseas scholar at St John's College, Cambridge and visiting professor at various institutions. He is a fellow of the Academy of the Social Sciences in Australia and of the Australian Academy of the Humanities.

== Publications ==
=== Benito Mussolini and the Fascist Destruction of Liberal Italy (1973) ===
Bosworth wrote his first book as part of a series – Topics in Modern History – seeking to assist high school and university teachers and students, providing a "guiding and stimulating" overview of Fascist Italy, rather than in-depth historical analysis. Noting that Fascist Italy has not garnered the attention of Nazi Germany, Bosworth makes clear his anti-Fascist tone from the beginning, aiming for "a more serious study of Italian Fascism than is usually given" by Anglo-Saxons 'misinterpreting and misunderstanding' Italian history. He presents Italy up to 1945 as pretending to be a Great Power in Europe, despite poor geography and resources, and argues that this pretence has taken its toll.

=== Italy: The Least of the Great Powers (1979) ===
As the title implies, Bosworth argues that Italy was largely ignored by the other major world powers at the beginning of the First World War. The book constitutes a "severely critical analysis of Italian diplomatic aims and methods." Stemming from Bosworth's Cambridge PhD thesis, Italy: The Least of the Great Powers has been said to possess an extraordinarily 'rich and complete' bibliography. Here again, Bosworth presents Italy as possessing the numbers and history of a great power, but really being closer to a small state or colony in identity. It is this book in which Bosworth argues that the Italian king, Victor Emmanuel III, was merely a figurehead.

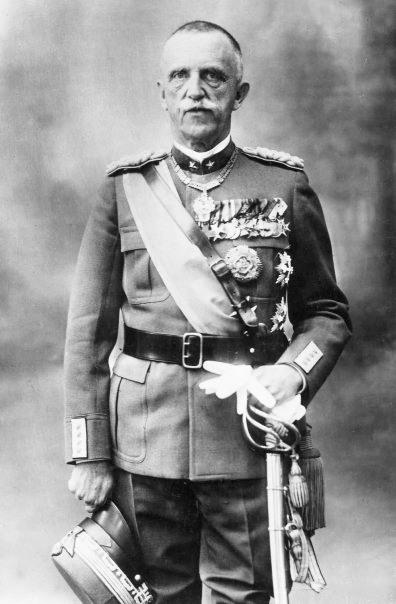
King Victor Emmanuel III of Italy

=== Italy and the Approach of the First World War (1983) ===
Bosworth discusses the various influence in Italy preceding the country's entrance into the First World War. He argues that Italian Foreign Minister Antonio di San Giuliano single-handedly controlled Italian foreign policy and rejected Italian responsibility to honour the Triple Alliance. Accordingly, Bosworth presents the Italian king, Victor Emmanuel III, as a figurehead, delegating power and rarely making positive foreign interventions. Bosworth portrays decision makers largely uninfluenced by external pressures, including an Italian public who wanted peace.

=== Explaining Auschwitz and Hiroshima (1993) ===
In this book, Bosworth aims to "pursue the question of the 'comfortable' or 'mad' ways in which societies went through the Second World War have historicised and thus comprehended that experience," emphasising that historicization over time. He particularly examines the historiographical controversies which occur when a society's account of the war seems inadequate.

=== Italy and the Wider World (1996) ===
Bosworth seeks to organise a collection of "contradictory images from Italy's past and Italy's present, [which] jostles for attention", both for Italian self-understanding and for the understanding of outsiders, such that "there are many Italies to be pondered, both in the scholarship of historian or of other experts and in the popular mind." Bosworth agrees with Antonio Gramsci and others that commentators must acknowledge the intricacies of Italian history, such as Italy's differing histories between the North and South, country and rural, or government and population. Bosworth emphasises the discrepancy in vision of 'legal' (bureaucracy) and 'real' (population) Italy, especially concerning 'dreams of empire'. Bosworth uses the notion of paese, an Italian word for both country and village, to illustrate the complexities of Italian nationhood, stating that each paese can be seen as "a world-ranging 'community'" or simply a village.

=== The Italian Dictatorship: Problems and Perspectives in the Interpretation of Mussolini and Fascism (1998) ===
In this 'personally inflected' book Bosworth analyses changing interpretations of Italian Fascism over time and their impact on Italian society, emphasising how these interpretations have been shaped by their environments. Bosworth opposes the work of Emilio Gentile and Renzo De Felice. He accuses both of being 'anti-anti-Fascist' (p. 23), failing to adequately condemn Italian Fascism, although this stance has been criticised as 'politicising scholarly activity'. Bosworth argues that recent scholarship has "deflected the field away from its moral and political purpose, which is to be vigilant against renewed fascism and protective of anti-fascism," attributing this failure to cultural relativism and postmodernism.

The book has been accused of being 'unnecessarily polemical', dismissing much of the work done in the last twenty years, which has focused on more specific elements of Italian Fascism, like "ideology, cultural products, government policy, gender relations, sexuality, and public and private space."

=== Mussolini (2002) ===
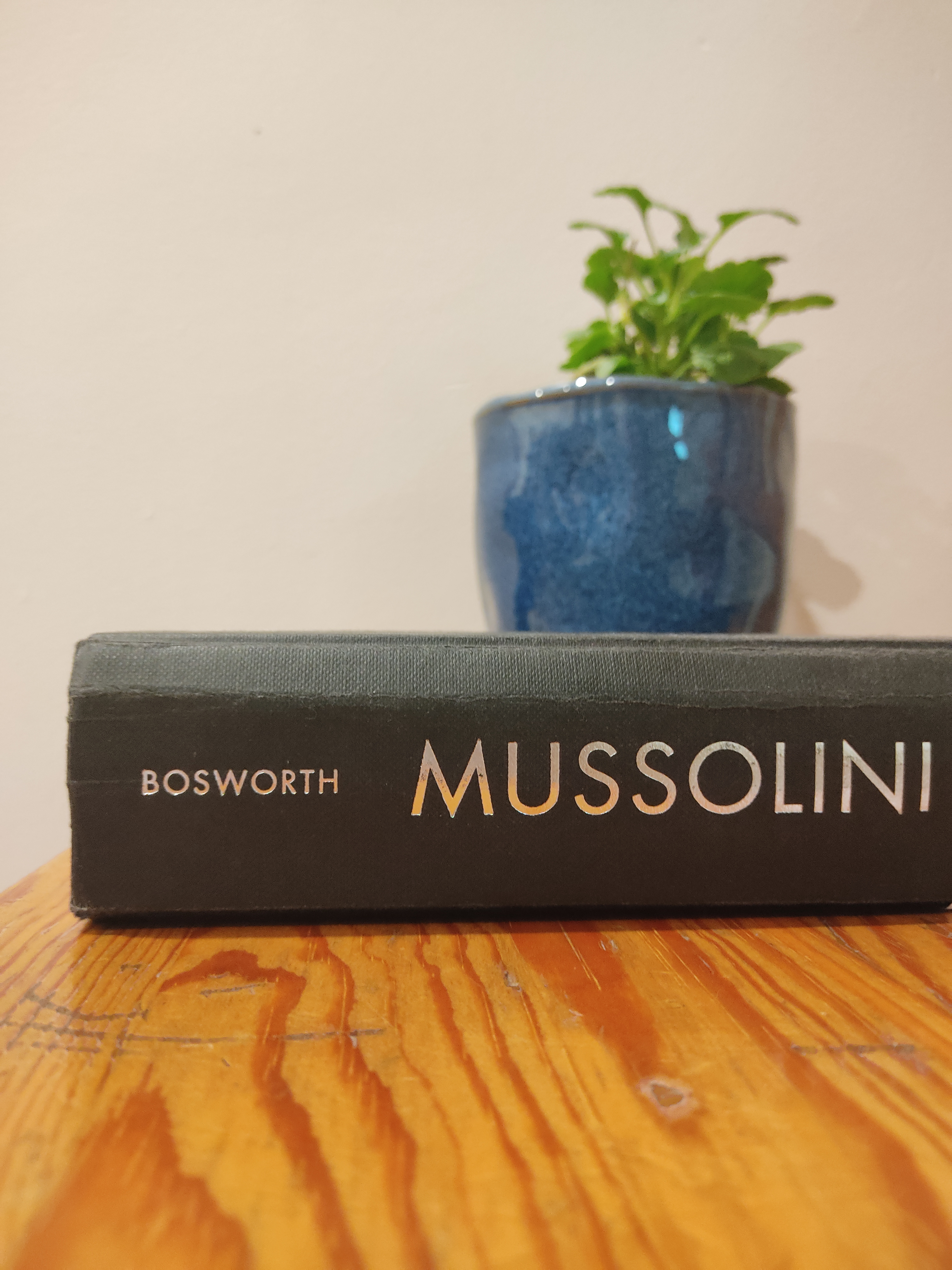
Bosworth's 2002 biography, Mussolini

==== Content ====
In this biography, Bosworth concentrates less on Mussolini's personality than his political actions, leading to an "avowedly anti-Fascist study of the Duce." The book begins with Mussolini's final two years, then explains how he got there. Bosworth presents Mussolini as a "bully, coward, and a failure", who could not effectively modernise Italy, and who represented the Italy of his time. Bosworth particularly criticised Mussolini's leadership in the late 1930s and portrays him as more of a people-pleaser than an ideologue. He even controversially contends that Mussolini "might have entered history as a figure of some light and some darkness", had he retired in 1932.

==== Reception ====
Referred to as a "well-received biography of Mussolini", Mussolini won Bosworth the $20,000 Premier's Prize at the Western Australian Premier's Book Awards, the most prestigious book prize in Western Australia. At the same Awards, Mussolini also won an award in the non-fiction category. Although one scholar notes an "occasionally rambling and disjointed narrative structure", he also calls it, "arguably the most complete biography of the Fascist dictator currently available in any language."

==== Scholarship ====
Bosworth's characterisation as a weak dictator, focused on short-term consolidation of power and prestige, differs from other scholars' portrayals. The book opposes the view of contemporaries that Mussolini had determined radically new foreign policy by the mid-1920s, instead depicting him as "an impatient and impulsive but continually oscillating opportunist in international affairs," who maintained the foreign policy of his predecessors. By portraying Mussolini not within revolutionary traditions but as a man without strict ideological beliefs, Bosworth disagrees with MacGregor Knox – a leader scholar on Italy – and Renzo De Felice – a "central and controversial" scholar on Italian Fascism.

=== Mussolini's Italy: Life Under the Dictatorship (2005) ===
Here, Bosworth examines the rise and fall of Fascist Italy. He combines various perspectives, including the mocking comments of Italian civilians under Mussolini. Mussolini's Italy was awarded a 2005 West Australian Premier's non-fiction prize and the 2006 New South Wales Premier's general history prize. It has been referred to as "a powerful work of scholarship, beautifully written, which should be read by anyone interested in 20th-century Europe, or indeed the antecedents of modern-day Italy."

=== Nationalism (2007) ===
Bosworth's book joined a quickly growing body of literature on nationalism. Bosworth primarily argues that nationalism is flawed, tempting us to lose sight of the goal of humankind's flourishing. The book is "certainly not written for beginners, requiring knowledge of the history of Europe and of nationalism generally. The book is written in Bosworth's signature playful tone and is "much closer to polemic than a thesis."

=== Whispering City (2011) ===
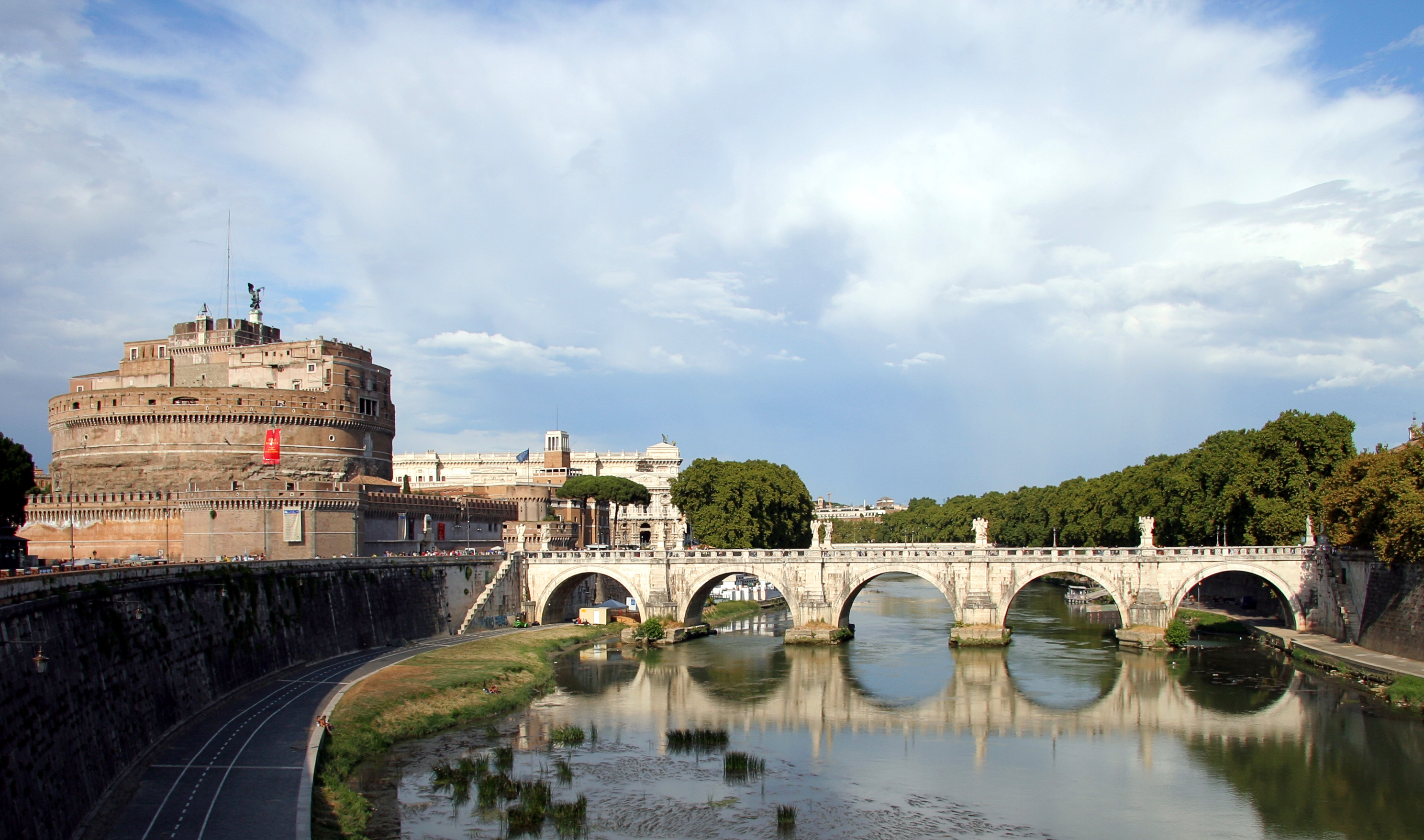
The St Angelo Bridge in Rome

In this book, Bosworth connects ancient and modern Rome into an account of the city through the centuries, examining its architecture and culture. He begins with Napoleonic occupation of Rome at the beginning of the 19th century, although at times he refers to history preceding the Napoleonic occupation. Bosworth contrasts the resulting Enlightenment ideals with competing worldviews and describes their continuing conflict. Thus, Bosworth incorporates examination of different periods into study of modern Rome. He also regularly includes maps and concentrates on different zones of the city, painting a picture of the city as it now stands.

Bosworth argues that study of Rome has typically been occupied with an historical narrative, driven off course by politics and power. The book particularly highlights the role of the Roman Catholic Church in such power struggles.

=== Italian Venice: A History (2014) ===
Bosworth sets out to provide a fresh description of Venice, knowing that the task has been declared impossible. Most commentators focus on the Republic from its foundation in 421 to its destruction by Napoleon in 1797. Bosworth explores the sentiment surrounding Venice as "the most beautiful city in the world, but...also one of the saddest." He focuses on her 'modern histories', especially how Venice reacted to Italian ownership and how it in turn impacted the city. In chapter 3, he describes the devastating impact of the First World War on Venice, going on to consider "what Fascism did to Venice and what Venice did to Fascism."

=== Claretta: Mussolini's Last Lover (2017) ===
In his most recent biography, Bosworth recounts the affair between Claretta Petacci and Benito Mussolini which began in 1936, when Petacci was separated from her husband. Bosworth portrays her as an 'unremarkable' "airhead", who was "neither charismatic nor clever nor cultured", despite belonging to a "respectable, ambitious and deeply Catholic Roman bourgeois family." According to Bosworth, Petacci was supported in the affair by her family, who hoped to manipulate her for their own benefit.

== Views ==
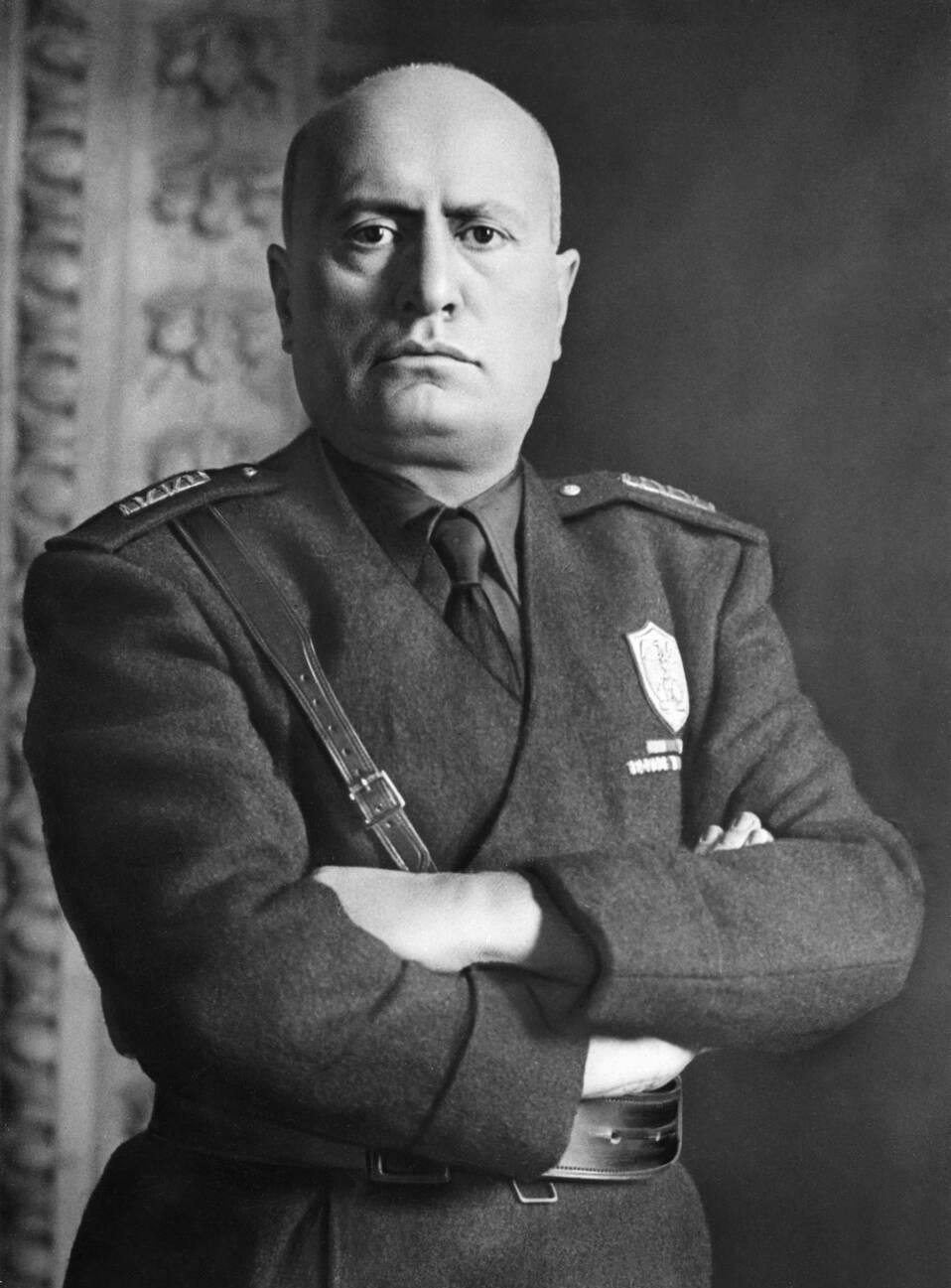
A portrait of Benito Mussolini from the 1930s

=== Interaction with scholarship on Mussolini ===
Bosworth's work on Italian Fascism fits into a topic of scholarship "as controversial and congested today as in the past." Bosworth fits into the orthodox Anglo-Saxon scholarly tradition on Italian Fascism: his biography focuses on Mussolini's politics, rather than his personality. When he does discuss Mussolini's personality, Bosworth portrays him uniquely:

"Bosworth's Duce was a cynical misanthrope, a crude Darwinist, and an ideological agnostic, a man who viewed politics not as a means to realize any long-held vision but rather as an area of opportunistic compromises and deals designed to achieve short-term tactical advantages that bolstered his own power and prestige."

Similarly, Bosworth's examination of Mussolini's politics differs from contemporaries. He has significant 'interpretive disagreements' with MacGregor Knox and Renzo De Felice. He disagrees with the assertion of Knox and De Felice that Mussolini fundamentally took Italy into war. He argues that Mussolini simply represented the Italy of his time, particularly their "feelings of inferiority and resentment after World War I", rather than swaying or deceiving his population.

Bosworth does agree with De Felice that the regime was generally accepted by the Italian people. He opposes recent scholars, who attribute Mussolini's power to the 'mythical and symbol universe of fascism', and above all Bosworth denies that Mussolini himself revolutionised and transformed Italy.

=== Interaction with scholarship on Italian Fascism ===
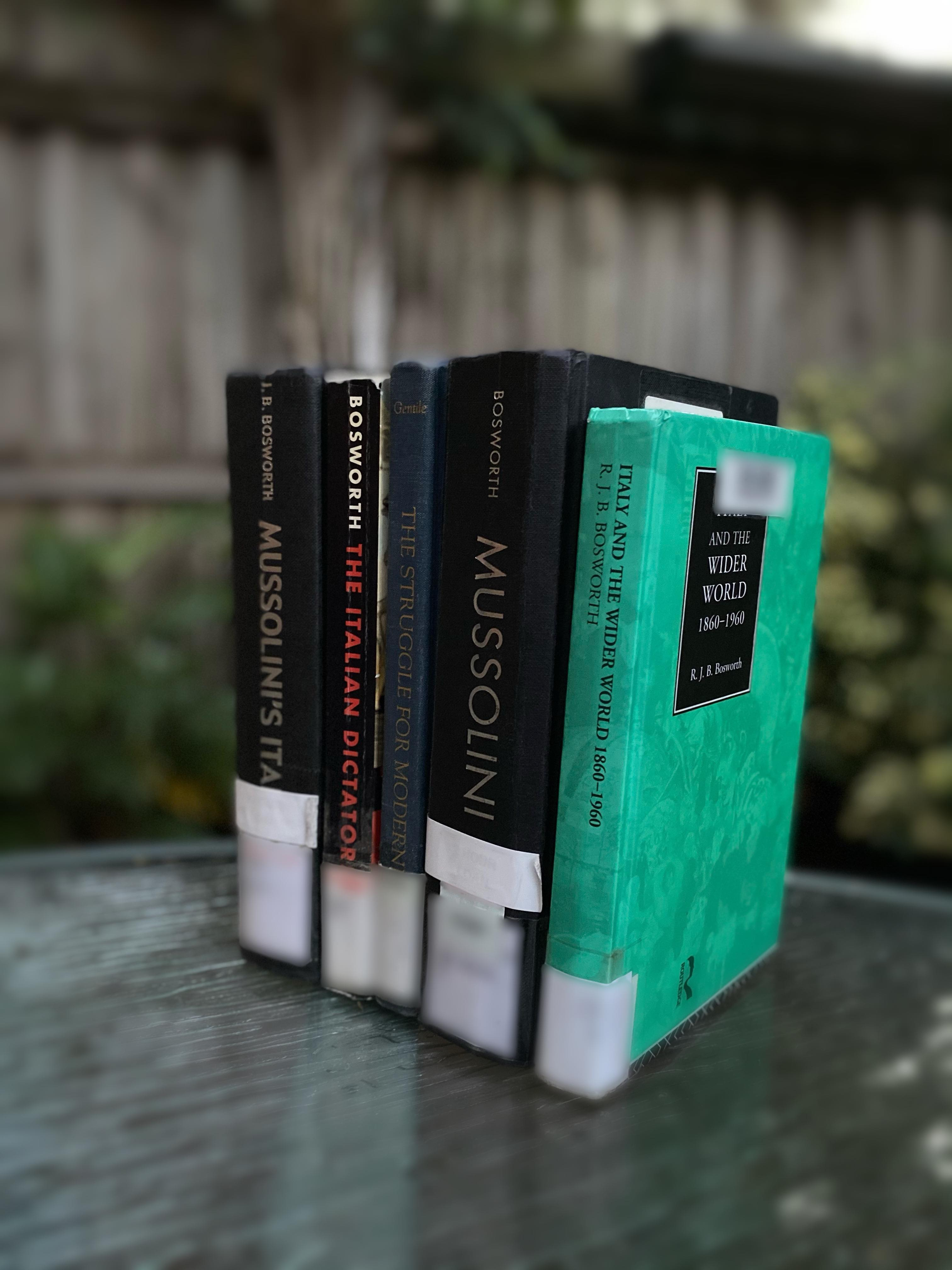
Various books, mostly authored by Bosworth. The one written by Gentile provides a very different historiographical philosophy

The most notable interaction between Bosworth and his contemporaries on the topic of Italian Fascism concerns the nature and purpose of the scholarship itself. Especially in his book The Italian Dictatorship, Bosworth condemns contemporary scholarship for what he sees as a failure to fulfil its moral and political duty. He particularly criticises Renzo De Felice as allegedly fitting into a group of 'anti-anti-Fascists', who fail to adequately condemn Italian Fascism. In this, Bosworth has been criticised as 'politicising scholarly activity' in a way which has caused him to neglect important advancements in the decades preceding his work.

Bosworth also critiques scholarly distinction between Fascist Italy and Nazi Germany, emphasising instead their similarities. He calls for scholarship to approach Fascism similarly to scholars of Nazism, applying similar historiographical questions. However, he acknowledges significant differences between foreign policies of Mussolini and German dictator Adolf Hitler.
