= Kate Mavor =

Kate Mavor CBE

Chief Executive Officer of English Heritage
- In office 2015–2023
- Preceded by: Simon Thurley

Chief Executive Officer of National Trust for Scotland
- In office 2009–2015
- Preceded by: Mark Adderley
- Succeeded by: Simon Skinner

Personal details
- Born: Katherine Lyndsay Mavor; 30 March 1962 (age 64) London, England
- Citizenship: United Kingdom
- Spouse: Andrew Williams (m. 1989)
- Children: 2
- Education: Westbourne School for Girls
- Alma mater: Trinity College, Oxford; Polytechnic of Central London

Katherine Lyndsay Mavor, CBE (born 30 March 1962) is a British charity executive and businesswoman. Since September 2023, she has been Master of St Cross College, Oxford. From 2015 to 2023, she was chief executive officer (CEO) of English Heritage. Previously, she was CEO of National Trust for Scotland from 2009 to 2015 and CEO of Project Scotland from 2005 to 2009.

== Early life and education ==
Mavor was born on 30 March 1962 in London, England, and was brought up in Glasgow, Scotland. She was educated at Westbourne School for Girls. In 1980, she matriculated into Trinity College, Oxford to study modern languages; this was only the second year that the previously all-male college admitted female students. She graduated from the University of Oxford with a Bachelor of Arts (BA) degree in 1984; as per tradition, this was later promoted to a Master of Arts (MA (Oxon)) degree. She later completed a postgraduate diploma in marketing at the Polytechnic of Central London.

== Career ==
=== Business career ===
Mavor's early career was spent in business and publishing. Having graduated from university, she spent a year as a graduate trainee at Thomson Books between 1984 and 1985. Then, she was a product manager at Macmillan Press from 1985 to 1986, and a publicity manager at Unwin Hyman from 1987 to 1988.

In 1988, Mavor moved into marketing, and was a marketing manager at Kogan Page for the next two years. From 1990 to 1994, she was Marketing Director for the Regent Schools of English. She was managing director of the Anglo-Polish Interchange between 1994 and 1997. The Anglo-Polish Interchange was set up by Mavor and is a market research company. In 1998, Mavor became marketing director of Language Line, a company offering telephone interpreting services. She was promoted to chief executive officer and led a venture-capital backed management buyout of the company.

=== Charity executive ===
From 2005 to 2009, she was CEO of Project Scotland, a Scottish volunteering organisation for young adults aged between 16 and 25. From 2009 to 2015, she was CEO of the National Trust for Scotland. On 3 February 2015, she was announced as the CEO of English Heritage. English Heritage became a charity in April 2015 having previously been a non-departmental public body of the British Government; when she officially became CEO in May 2015, she also became the first head of the new charity.

=== St Cross College ===
In 2023, Mavor was announced as the new master of St Cross College, with effect from September 2023.

== Personal life ==
In 1989, Mavor married Andrew Williams. Together, they have two sons.

== Honours ==
In November 2014, Mavor was awarded a Doctor of the University (DUniv) degree by Heriot-Watt University "in recognition of her exceptional contribution to the promotion and preservation of Scotland's environmental heritage and to developments in the community volunteer movement". In 2015, she was made an honorary fellow of Trinity College, Oxford, her alma mater.

She was appointed Commander of the Order of the British Empire (CBE) in the 2022 New Year Honours for services to heritage.
