= Per Saugman =

Per Gotfried Saugman
- Born: June 26, 1925; Slagelse, Denmark
- Died: November 25, 2005 (aged 80); Copenhagen, Denmark
- Occupation: Publisher
- Years active: 1952–1990
- Organization: Blackwell Scientific Publications

Per Saugman (26 June 1925 – 25 November 2005) was a director of Blackwell Scientific Publications.

Saugman was honored as a knight of the Order of the Falcon and the Order of the Dannebrog, and also received an honorary OBE. He was granted an honorary Master of Arts degree in 1979 by the University of Oxford and elected as a fellow of both St. Cross and Green College.

== Career ==
After graduating from Gentofte State School, Saugman was apprenticed in Ejnar Munksgaard's bookshop in 1941. After completing his apprenticeship in 1945, he supplemented his education at scientific publishers and bookstores in Switzerland and England. In 1950 he returned to Munksgaard's company but by 1952 had begun working at Blackwell Scientific Publications in Oxford and Edinburgh as a sales manager. The following year, he was appointed as the head of his department, a post he held until 1987. After taking over the management of Blackwell Scientific Publications, Per Saugman managed to lead the initially modest publishing house to be one of the leading scientific publishers in the English-speaking world with branches in the USA and Australia.

In 1963, on the initiative of Per Saugman, Blackwell Scientific took over the majority of shares in Ejnar Munksgaard's company. Saugman thus became a member of Munksgaard's board of directors from 1964 until 1992, and was chairman of the board 1967. Per Saugman also sat on the board of BH Blackwell Booksellers, The Publishers Association, and the International Association of Scientific, Technical, and Medical Publishers. Per Saugman's career in the international publishing world must be characterized as something out of the ordinary. In Denmark, he was a board member of Hans Reitzel's publishing house (1984–92) and of Høst & søns publishing house (1986–92).

Per Saugman was born in Stillinge Sogn, within the municipality of Slagelse, on 26 June 1925. His parents were Esther Lehmann (1887–1986) and Emanuel Andreas Gotfred Saugman (1878–1962), a physician and general practitioner. On 28 December 1950 he married Patricia Doreen Fulford (1929–2004) in Bristol, her hometown. He and Patricia had three children. After her death, Per married his second wife, Sidsel Brun, in October 2005. He died 25 November 2005 in Denmark.

== Written works ==
- From the First Fifty Years: An Informal History of Blackwell Scientific Publications. Oxford: Blackwell. 1993. ISBN 978-0-63-202718-7.
- Noget med bøger. 1995.
- Levnedsberetning i ordenskapitlet.
