= E. Peter Raynes =

Professor of Optoelectronic Engineering

Edward Peter Raynes FRS HonFInstP (born 4 July 1945) is Professor of Optoelectronic Engineering at the University of Oxford (since 1998). He was, and continues to be, an early developer and advocate of liquid crystal displays (LCDs).

Raynes was educated at St Peter's School, York and obtained his PhD from the University of Cambridge; he then worked at RSRE (Malvern) for 21 years until 1991. He is a Fellow of St Cross College. He has been the chief scientist of Sharp Laboratories (Europe) since 1992.

== Awards ==
- IoP Paterson medal 1986

== Selected publications ==
- Electro-optic response times in liquid crystals, E. Jakeman, and E. P. Raynes, Physics Letters A, Vol. 39, Iss. 1, pp. 69–70 1972. doi:10.1016/0375-9601(72)90332-5
- Improved contrast uniformity in twisted nematic liquid-crystal electro-optic display devices, E P Raynes, Electronics Letters. Vol. 10, pp. 141–142. (1974)
- Recent advances in liquid crystal materials and display devices, E. P. Raynes, IEEE Transactions on Electron Devices, vol. ED-26, pp. 1116–1122 (1979).
- Supertwisted nematic liquid crystal displays (review), E. P. Raynes and C. M. Waters, Displays, Vol. 8, Iss. 2, pp. 59–63 (1987) doi:10.1016/0141-9382(87)90038-2
- Optical studies of thin layers of smectic-C materials, Anderson, M.H., Jones, J.C., Raynes, E.P., Towler, M.J., Journal of Physics D: Applied Physics, Vol. 24, Iss. 3, pp. 338–342 (1991) doi:10.1088/0022-3727/24/3/016
- Ferroelectric liquid crystal display, Koden, M., et al., Shapu Giho/Sharp Technical Journal, Iss. 69, pp. 47–50 (1997)
