= Alwyn Robbins =

British geodesist (1920–2002)

Alwyn Rudolph Robbins (5 January 1920 – 9 or 10 January 2002) was a British geodesist, former chairman of the Royal Society subcommittee on geodesy, and a founding fellow of St Cross College at the University of Oxford. Robbins published on geodesy and photogrammetry, with additional contributions to geodetic astronomy and the development of clocks. He held multiple positions within the International Association of Geodesy during his career as well.

== Early life, education, and military service ==
Alwyn Robbins was born in Lydney, Gloucestershire on 5 January 1920. (Note: Sources conflict on Robbins' place of birth, with both Lydney and Oxford put forward. His date of birth is calculated from his age at death.) He was educated at Blundell's School in Tiverton, Devon, winning multiple scholarships and exhibitions to attend Hertford College of the University of Oxford. At Hertford, he studied mathematics, and participated in rowing, squash, and tennis.

Robbins graduated from Oxford in 1940, (Note: Olliver 2002 states that Robbins did not complete his degree until after his return from military service, but other sources offer that his graduation occurred before mobilisation.) and was awarded his degree with first class honours. Later that year, he received a commission in the Survey Branch of the Royal Engineers and was posted to West Africa.

From his studies at Oxford, Robbins had also received Master of Science, Master of Arts, and Doctor of Philosophy degrees.

== Career ==
Following military demobilisation in 1946, Robbins returned to Oxford and soon gained a post as an academic post in surveying. He was promoted multiple times and continued to climb the ranks, becoming a reader and head of the surveying and geodesy department in 1966 upon the retirement of Guy Bomford. Olliver 2002 records:

His work for his BSc degree (converted to MSc) involved developing precise formulae for the geometry of long lines on the earth ellipsoid. His D.Phil. project was an investigation of the shape of the geoid – the equipotential surface of the Earth's gravity field that coincides with the sea surface – in England and Scotland. This involved making astronomical observations at 43 Ordnance Survey triangulation points, extending from Dover to John o'Groats – an arduous campaign over several seasons that had to be fitted in with his academic duties. His particular interest in astronomy was the definition and precise measurement of time, and he designed a highly accurate portable printing chronometer for use in geodetic astronomy, which was successfully marketed. He was also the author of a military handbook on the same subject.

Robbins published on geodesy and on timekeeping, and held several appointments within the International Association of Geodesy. He also represented the United Kingdom on the international scale as a delegate to conferences and assemblies, and was the chairman of the geodesy subcommittee of the Royal Society. He also had extensive international connections and spent in various countries, as well as a two-year secondment with the Ministry of Defence. During his time at Oxford, robbins held multiple visiting professorships, including at Ohio State University, Kwame Nkrumah University of Science and Technology, and the University of Otago.

In 1980, Robbins retired, becoming an emeritus fellow of St Cross College. During his career, he had been elected Fellow of the Royal Institution of Chartered Surveyors, Fellow of the Royal Astronomical Society, and Fellow of the Royal Geographical Society.

== Personal life and death ==
Following his retirement, Robbins moved to Devon and pursued recreational fly-fishing. He died in his home at Ottery St Mary on 9 or 10 January 2002. (Note: Sources conflict on date of death: Olliver 2002 and Survey Review 2002 state he died on 9 January, while Ashkenazi 2002 and Ashkenazi & Lachapelle 2002 state he died on 10 January.) He was survived by his wife Mary and his children: a son and a daughter, Mike and Rowena.

== Sources ==
- "Alwyn R Robbins, 1920–2002". Survey Review. 36 (285): 563–564. July 2002. doi:10.1179/sre.2002.36.285.563.
- Ashkenazi, Vidal (May 2002). Andersen, Ole Baltazar (ed.). "IAG Newsletter: In Memoriam". Journal of Geodesy. 76: 300–301. doi:10.1007/s00190-002-0258-5.
- Ashkenazi, Vidal; Lachapelle, Gérard (2002). "Alwyn R. Robbins". Geomatica. 56 (1): 83. doi:10.5623/geomat-2002-0014.
- Olliver, Joe (2002). "Obituaries: Alwyn Rudolph Robbins (1919-2002), Founding Fellow". The Record (20). St Cross College, Oxford. Archived from the original on 9 January 2010.
