= Robert Wolfe =

American army officer (1921–2014)

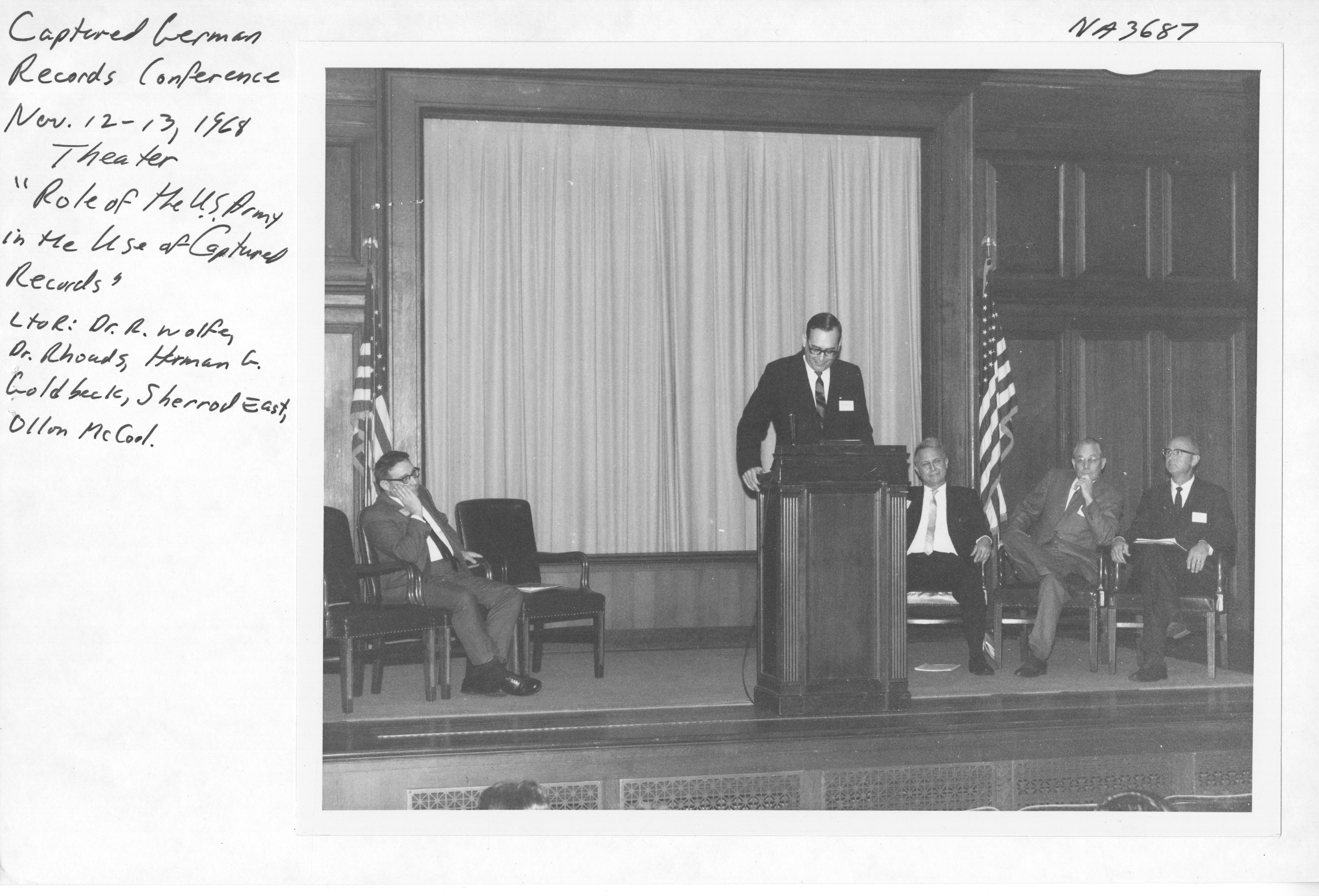
- Robert Wolfe (left)
- Born: March 2, 1921; Burlington, Vermont, U.S.
- Died: December 9, 2014 (aged 93); Alexandria, VA, U.S.
- Resting place: Arlington National Cemetery
- Education: Columbia University
- Occupation: Archivist
- Years active: 1961–2005
- Employer: U.S. government
- Organization: US National Archives
- Known for: Knowledge of World War II Nazi war documents.
- Notable work: Americans as proconsuls; Holocaust: the documentary evidence; U.S. Intelligence and the Nazis
- Spouse: Ingeborg Edith Kirch
- Children: 2

Robert Wolfe (March 2, 1921 – December 9, 2014) was a U.S. Army officer, historian, and retired senior archivist of the US National Archives. He was wounded in both the Pacific and European Theaters of Operation. He commanded a recon team and also an anti-landmine platoon. He was a subject-matter expert on captured Nazi war documents. Wolfe worked for 34 years at the Archives, functioning as its senior specialist for captured German and related records.

== Military career ==
Wolfe received head wounds in both theaters. While recovering from his first wound, he served in a training cadre in Ohio. After receiving his second head wound in France, he was assigned to the Office of Military Censorship in Paris, France.

After the end of the European war, he joined the Office of Military Government in Heidelberg, Germany. At first his duties were with the prosecutors' office for the Nuremberg War Crimes trials. After the trials ended, he worked with U.S. efforts to rebuild the German civilian government.

The office manager in 1947 was Ingeborg Edith Kirch. She and Wolfe were married in 1948 before leaving Germany for the U.S. They returned to Manhattan, New York City, where Robert completed his education at Columbia University. While working on his doctorate, he taught history and political science at Brooklyn College.

== NARA career ==
He joined the National Archives in 1961, upon concluding service as a member of the American Historical Association team microfilming captured German records at the World War II Records Center in Alexandria, Virginia.

=== Berlin Document Center ===
Wolfe also served as archival consultant to the Department of State for the Berlin Document Center (BDC) and as Special Adviser to Eli Wiesel for the United States Holocaust Memorial Museum. His publications include: Captured German and Related Records: a National Archives Conference (1974) and Americans as Proconsuls: U.S. Military Government in Germany and Japan, 1944-52 (1984).

As archival consultant to the Department of State for the BDC from 1968 to 1994, Wolfe was the chief American negotiator for the return to the West German government of original captured Nazi Party personnel records assembled by the victors at the BDC. During that time, he wrote official reports and presented and published papers concerning the history of those records, specifically including reference to the discovery and capture of the Nazi Party records found at the paper mill in Schwabing-Freimann, Germany. One such publication was "A Short History of the Berlin Document Center", written as a Preface to "The Holdings of the Berlin Document Center: A Guide to the Collections" (BDC, Berlin, 1994).

In 2001, Wolfe wrote a monograph describing the discovery of the Nazi Party's worldwide membership card file by U.S. Army Counter Intelligence Corps Agent Michel Thomas in early May 1945.

=== Interagency Working Group ===
Wolfe was one of eight independent historians employed by the Interagency Working Group (IWG) to assist in implementing the declassification and disclosures under the provisions of the Nazi War Crimes Disclosure Act (NWCDA). The IWG had been established to oversee the review of Federal agency records under consideration for declassification. These historians served as ex officio members of the IWG and were involved in all aspects of the IWG's work with German and Japanese Imperial war records in order to comply with the "largest congressionally mandated declassification project in U.S. history".

The eight million pages of material declassified by the IWG under the NWCDA added significantly to the publicly available information about Nazi war crimes, collaborators, and the lives of selected criminals following the war. Wolfe was one of the authors of a 2004 report entitled U.S. Intelligence and the Nazis which was revised and released the following year, 2005, by Cambridge University Press as a book.

Among the senior Nazis intensely sought by the Allies was Heinrich Müller, who was head of the Gestapo. No arrest was reported; no body was identified. Both the Soviets and the West wanted to interrogate him about many aspects of the war. Wolfe and three other historians analyzed what evidence was available. Their conclusion, "The Mystery of Heinrich Müller: New Materials from the CIA," Holocaust and Genocide Studies published in 2001, was that Müller had been killed in Berlin as the war drew to a close.

The expertise of the historians in the searching process and their resulting analysis of the records was a major contribution to public understanding of World War II war crimes and the involvement of U.S. agencies relating to those charged or suspected of war crimes.

== Death and tributes ==
Wolfe died in Alexandria, Virginia, on December 9, 2014, survived by his wife and two sons. He directed that there be no funeral but, that he be buried in Arlington National Cemetery. He was buried, along with his wife, who died on April 2, 2015, on July 10, 2015. He was among the last of the subject specialists at the National Archives. Shlomo Aronson paid tribute to his memory as "a treasurer of the WWII records at the US National Archives, and a warm, humorous mensch. ... We historians will cherish his memory." Edwin Black said of him, "The National Archives has lost one of its most precious resources. But mostly, history has lost a most valiant soldier."

== Bibliography ==
=== Books ===
- Wolfe, Robert (1975). Captured German and related records: a National Archives conference: papers and proceedings of the Conference on Captured German and Related Records, November 12–13, 1968, the National Archives building, Washington, D. C. Athens, Ohio: Ohio University Press. ISBN 0-8214-0172-6.
- Wolfe, Robert (1984). Americans as proconsuls: United States military government in Germany and Japan, 1944-1952. Carbondale: Southern Illinois University Press. ISBN 0-8093-1115-1.
- Gwiazda, Henry J.; Wolfe, Robert (1993). Holocaust: the documentary evidence. Washington, DC: National Archives and Records Administration. ISBN 0-911333-92-4.
- Wolfe, Robert; Breitman, Richard; Goda, Norman J. W.; Naftali, Timothy J. (2004). U.S. Intelligence and the Nazis. National Archives Trust Fund. ISBN 1-880875-26-8.

=== Reports ===
- von Oppen, Beate Ruhm; Dehmelt, Bernard K.; Wolfe, Robert; Haskett, Miriam, eds. (1961). "No. 33. Records of the Reich Leader of the SS and Chief of the German Police (Part II)" (PDF). RG 242 Microfilm Publication 175, GUIDES TO GERMAN RECORDS MICROFILMED AT ALEXANDRIA, VA. U. S. National Archives and Records Administration, Washington. D. C. p. 98.
- Weinberg, Gerhard; Carroll, Bernice; Wolfe, Robert; Fletcher, Willard Allen; Haskett, Miriam, eds. (1962). "No. 36. Miscellaneous German Records Collection (Part III)" (PDF). Microfilm Publication T-84, GUIDES TO GERMAN RECORDS MICROFILMED AT ALEXANDRIA, VA. U. S. National Archives and Records Administration, Washington. D. C. p. 70.
- Wolfe, Robert. "RG 263 Detailed Report, Adolf Eichmann". Records of the Central Intelligence Agency, Records of the Directorate of Operations. U. S. National Archives and Records Administration, Washington. D. C.
