= Carole Souter =

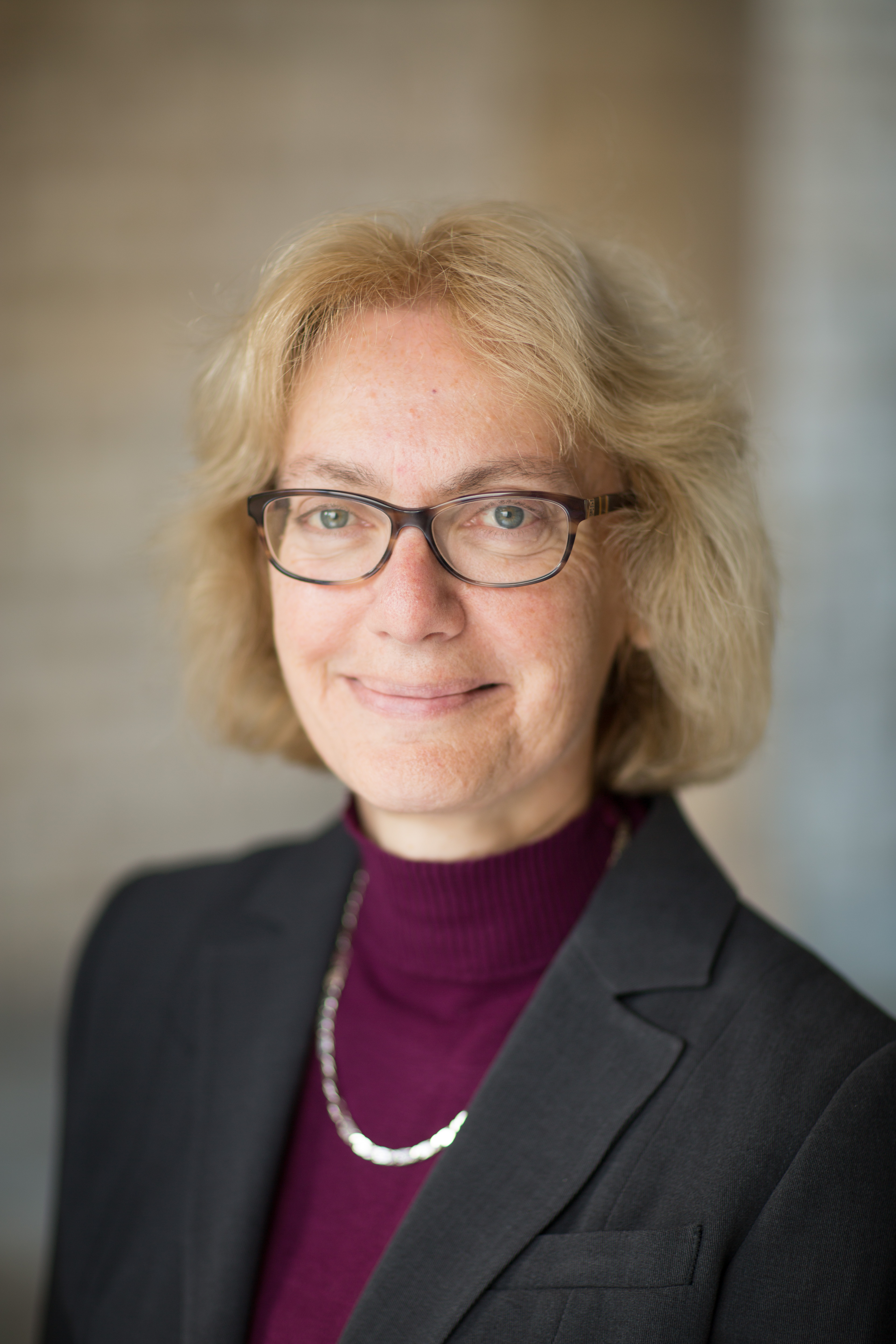
Carole Souter in September 2016

Carole Souter CBE FSA FRSA (née Teague, born 1957) is the current Chair of The Heritage Alliance and Sulgrave Manor Trust and the former Interim Chair of Historic Royal Palaces. She is a former Master of St Cross College, Oxford, and Chief Executive of the National Heritage Memorial Fund and Heritage Lottery Fund.

== Biography ==
Born in 1957, Souter obtained a Bachelor of Arts degrees in Philosophy, Politics and Economics from Jesus College, Oxford, between 1975 - 1978, and a Master of Arts in Victorian Studies from the University of London between 1981 - 1982. By 2016, her career had spanned "over 30 years of policy development and operational management in the public sector", including work in the civil service in the Department of Health, the Department of Social Security and the Cabinet Office.

Souter joined the National Heritage Memorial Fund and Heritage Lottery Fund in 2003, having previously been Director of Planning and Development at English Heritage.

Her other board appointments have included the boards of Creativity, Culture and Education, the Kent Wildlife Trust, and the National Communities Resource Centre (at Trafford Hall). She was also a member of the Academy of Urbanism and a trustee of Horniman Museum and Gardens. She is a lay canon of Salisbury Cathedral and Chairs its Fabric Advisory Committee.

In March 2016, Souter was appointed as a trustee of Historic Royal Palaces.

In May 2016, it was announced that the Fellows of St Cross College, Oxford, had elected Souter as the next Master of the College. In September 2016, she succeeded Sir Mark Jones, who had been Master of St Cross since 2011.

In June 2020, it was announced by the Governing Body of Oriel College, Oxford, UK, that Souter would chair an 'Independent Commission of Inquiry' into the intended removal of the Cecil Rhodes statue and plaque at Oriel College, as well as related matters such as "how to improve access and attendance of BAME undergraduate, graduate students and faculty". This inquiry arose in response to immense pressure from the Rhodes Must Fall movement in Oxford, and from the wider Black Lives Matter movement. The Commission was due to report by the end of 2020 but the report was delayed a couple of times. The final report for the commission set up to examine the figure's future said the "majority" of its members supported its removal but Oriel College said it would not seek to move the statue due to costs and "complex" planning processes.

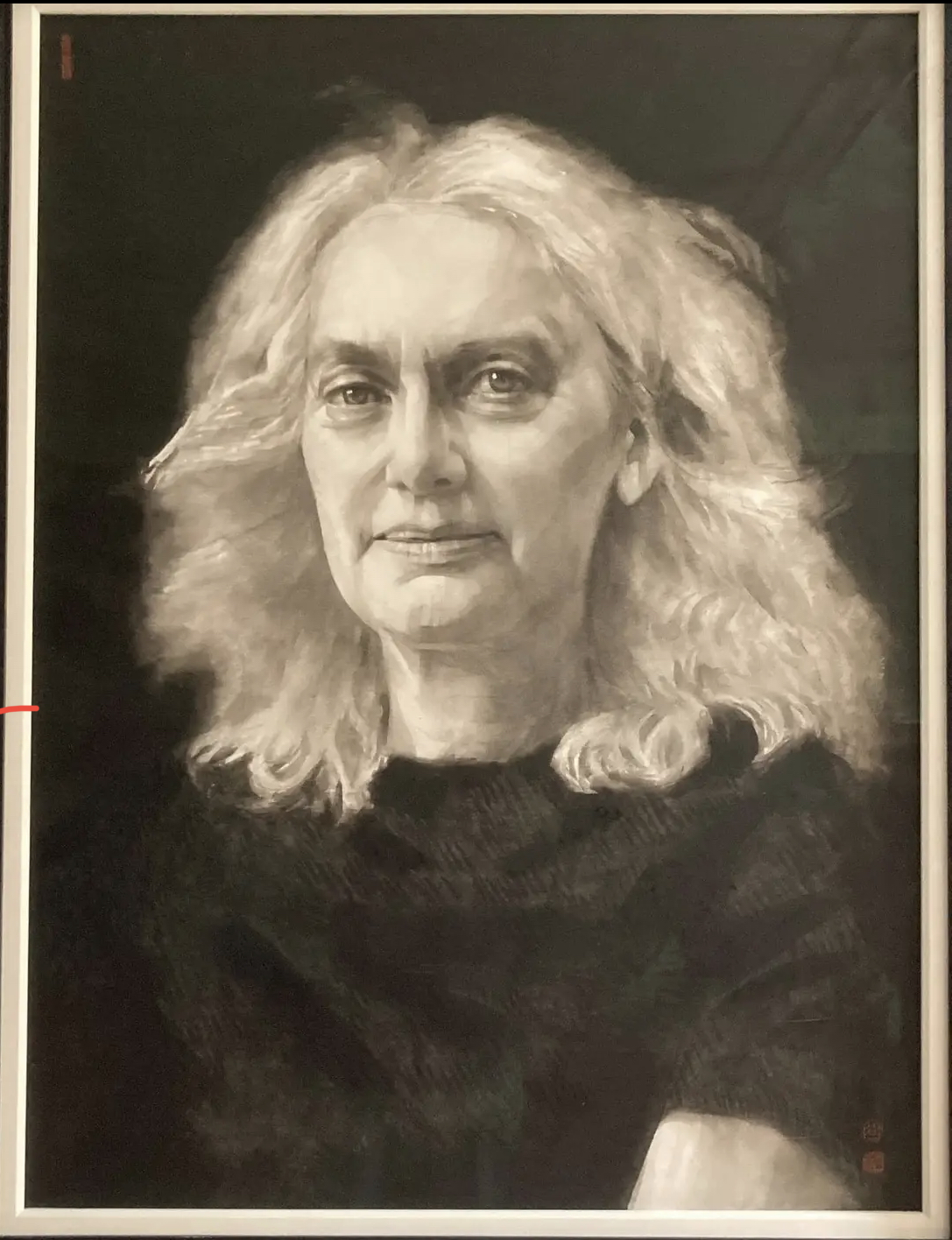
Souter portrait at St Cross college. The portrait was commissioned by Qui Leilei and gifted by Souter to the college.

As of Sep. 2022, and after 6 years, Souter retired her duties as St Cross College, Oxford. She took the role of Interim Chair of Historic Royal Palaces, from which she stood down at the end of December 2023.

In January 2023 she became Chair of the Sulgrave Manor Trust and in July 2024 Chair of The Heritage Alliance.

== Awards and honours ==
Souter was made a Commander of the Order of the British Empire (CBE) in the 2011 New Year Honours list for services to conservation. In 2014, she was elected a Fellow of the Society of Antiquaries of London. Souter is also a Fellow of the Royal Society of Arts (FRSA). She was made an Honorary Fellow of Jesus College, Oxford in 2011.

== Personal life ==
Souter is married with two children.
