= Kelsey Leonard =

Native American water governance researcher

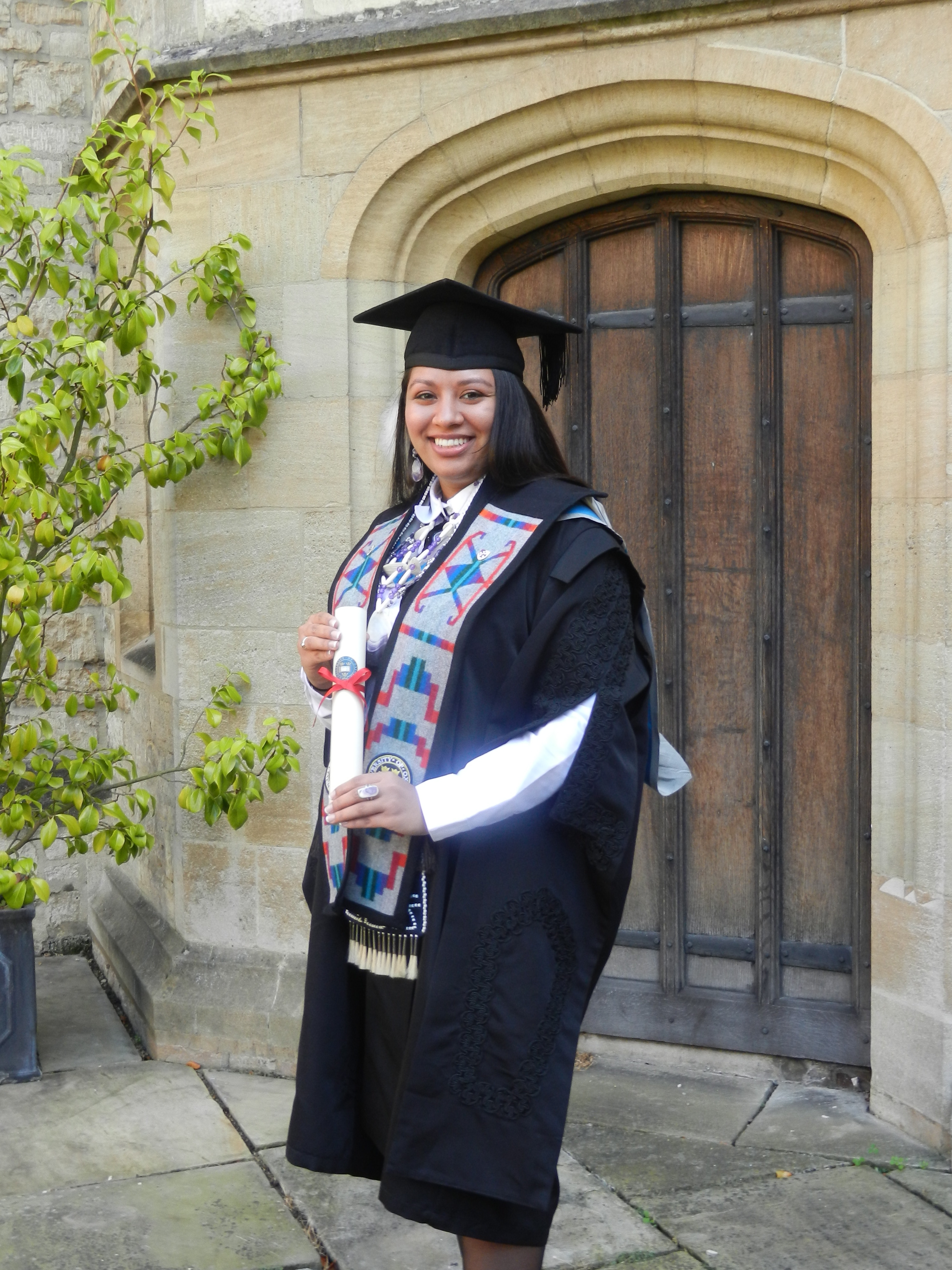

Academic background
- Education: Harvard University (B.A.); University of Oxford (M.Sc.); Duquesne University School of Law (J.D.); McMaster University (Ph.D.)
- Website: https://www.kelseyleonard.com

Kelsey Leonard is a water governance researcher specializing in Indigenous water rights at the University of Waterloo. She was the first Native American woman to earn a science degree from the University of Oxford, which she earned in 2012. She earned an MSc in water science, policy and management from St. Cross College, one of the thirty-eight colleges of the University of Oxford. Her master's thesis, “Water Quality For Native Nations: Achieving A Trust Responsibility”, discusses water quality regulation and how water resources on tribal land are not protected.

Kelsey Leonard is an enrolled member of the Shinnecock Indian Nation and is originally from the Shinnecock Indian Reservation on Long Island, New York. In 2010, she was the first member of the Shinnecock Nation to graduate from Harvard University. Her Harvard degree is a Bachelor of Arts degree in sociology and anthropology with a secondary field in ethnic studies.

Leonard earned a JD from Duquesne University School of Law, and a PhD in political science from McMaster University. She is now an assistant professor at the University of Waterloo.

Leonard's TED Talk, "Why lakes and rivers should have the same rights as humans", has had 3.5 million views as of October 2023.
