= Camilla Toulmin =

British economist

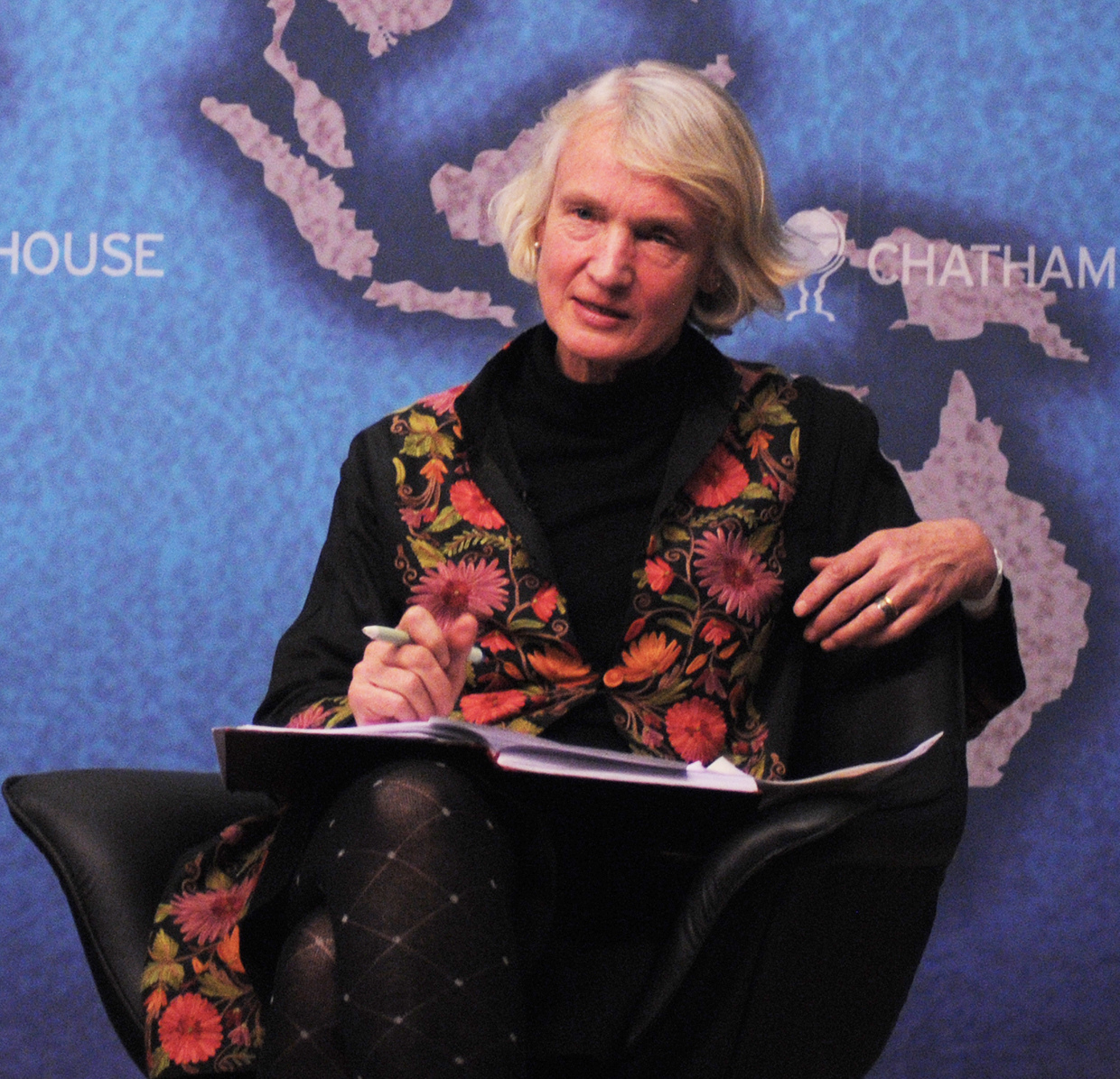
Camilla Toulmin at Chatham House in London in 2013

Ann Camilla Toulmin FRSE (/ˈtuːlmɪn/; born 1954, Melbourne) is a British economist and former Director of the International Institute for Environment and Development (IIED). Her career has focused on policy research about agriculture, land, climate and livelihoods in dryland regions of Africa, particularly in Mali. She became a senior fellow of IIED in late June 2015, is an Associate of the Institute for New Economic Thinking, and Professor of Practice at the Lancaster Environment Centre, Lancaster University.

== Education and career ==
Toulmin has a BA degree in economics from Cambridge University, an MSc in Development Economics from the School of Oriental and African Studies, and a DPhil in the economics of Malian dryland farming households from the University of Oxford. Her DPhil used data collected while running a research programme in Mali. From 1987 to 2002, she managed IIED's Drylands Programme, and was the Institute's director from February 2004 to June 2015.

She is on the board of trustees of the Little Sparta Trust, and judge for the St Andrews Prize for the Environment. In 2019, she was elected a Fellow of the Royal Society of Edinburgh.

== Scholarship ==
Toulmin has used applied economics and interdisciplinary resource management tools in her own studies of agrarian change, resource management, and the juggling of everyday livelihood options, predominately in the African drylands. She used local studies in Africa, and notably in Mali, to inform development policy on decentralisation, governance and land tenure issues. As Director of IIED, she commented more widely on climate change policy, the Sustainable Development Goals, capacity building and advocacy.

== Personal life ==
Toulmin is the daughter of philosopher Stephen Toulmin. She is married to Sir Mark Jones, and has three children.

== Publications (selection) ==
- Krätli, S. & Toulmin, C. 2020. Farmer-herder conflict in sub-Saharan Africa? London: IIED. en français
- Toulmin, C. 2020. Land, Investment, and Migration: Thirty-five Years of Village Life in Mali. Oxford University Press.
- J.Pretty, C. Toulmin, S.Williams (eds.). 2011. Sustainable Intensification: Increasing Productivity in African Food and Agricultural Systems. London: Earthscan.
- Toulmin, C. 2009. Climate Change in Africa. London: Zed Books. ISBN 978-1-84813-015-9
- C. Reij, I. Scoones, C. Toulmin (eds.) 2006. Sustaining the Soil: Indigenous soil and water conservation in Africa. London: Earthscan. ISBN 1-85383-372-X
- B.Wisner, C. Toulmin, R.Chitiga. (eds.) 2005. Towards a New Map of Africa. London: Earthscan.
- C.Toulmin, P.Lavigne Delville, S.Traoré (eds.) 2002. The Dynamics of Resource Tenure in West Africa. London: Earthscan.
- I. Scoones, C. Toulmin. 2001. Policies for Soil Fertility Management in Africa. Sussex and London: IDS and DfID.
- Toulmin, C. 1992. Cattle, women, and wells: managing household survival in the Sahel. Oxford: Clarendon.
