= Theoretical Criminology =

- Discipline: Criminology
- Language: English
- Edited by: Mary Bosworth, Leslie Paik

Publication details
- History: 1997-present
- Publisher: SAGE Publications
- Frequency: Quarterly
- Impact factor: 2.383 (2013)

Standard abbreviations
- ISO 4: Theor. Criminol.

Indexing
- CODEN: TRCNFA
- ISSN: 1362-4806 (print); 1461-7439 (web)
- LCCN: 97643339
- OCLC no.: 41385938

Links
- Journal homepage; Online access; Online archive

Theoretical Criminology is a peer-reviewed academic journal covering the fields of criminology and penology. The journal's editors-in-chief are Mary Francesca Bosworth (University of Oxford) and Leslie Paik (Arizona State University). It was established in 1997 and is currently published by SAGE Publications.

== Abstracting and indexing ==
Theoretical Criminology is abstracted and indexed in Scopus and the Social Sciences Citation Index. According to the Journal Citation Reports, its 2013 impact factor is 2.383, ranking it 3 out of 52 journals in the category "Criminology and Penology".
