= John F. Jungclaussen =

German journalist and historian

- Born: June 4, 1970 (age 56); Hamburg, West Germany
- Education: University of Oxford
- Occupation: Historian

John Frederik Jungclaussen (born 4 June 1970) is a German journalist and historian working in the UK.

Jungclaussen writes and speaks about European history since the Enlightenment, Anglo-German relations, and European current affairs. While he remains unconvinced about the benefits of Brexit to the UK economy he is equally sceptical about the long-term future of the post-war European project. "As long as the fundamental structural asymmetry of a monetary union without a fiscal union is ignored, the Europe of Robert Schumann and Jean Monnet is doomed."

== Early life ==
Jungclaussen was born in Hamburg. He attended the Gelehrtenschule des Johanneums. In 1993 he moved to Britain to read history and economics at Queen Mary University of London and King's College London. He was awarded a Bachelor (Honours) degree 2:1 before moving to St Cross College, Oxford, where he studied under the supervision of Niall Ferguson. In 2002, he gained a DPhil in History from the University of Oxford for his thesis "The Nazis and Hamburg's Merchant Elite - a History of Decline, 1933-1945"

== Career ==
=== Newspapers ===
In 2001, he became the UK Economics Correspondent of Die Zeit. Since then he has also written widely for the British media (The Times, The Daily Telegraph, Mail on Sunday), the Swiss Basler Zeitung and Die Weltwoche, as well as other German publications (Der Tagesspiegel, Cicero, and Die Welt).

=== Books ===
Schöpfer und Zerstörer

In 2004, Jungclaussen and Uwe Jean Heuser published a collection of portraits of some of the most influential entrepreneurs in modern economic history. In their foreword, Heuser and Jungclaussen argue that throughout history, successful entrepreneurs all share some of a number of characteristics which sets them apart:

- independent thinking
- readiness to learn
- a deep understanding of the market
- stubbornly sticking to an idea
- readiness to change the rules
- grasping opportunities
- understanding leadership
- frugality - "you're not in it for the money"
- ruthlessness
- business must be fun

The book was awarded the "Herbert Quandt Medien-Preis". It was also published in Korea.

Risse in Weissen Fassaden

In 2006, Jungclaussen published his PhD thesis in Germany. He re-evaluates the role of Hamburg's merchant elite during the rise of Nazism, the Second World War, and, ultimately, the Holocaust. Contrary to the notion established by previous generations of historians that the city's bourgeois elite continued to influence national politics in Germany as they had done for centuries, this close network of merchant families were, in fact, on a path of inexorable social, political and economic decline which only accelerated after Adolf Hitler came to power in 1933.

=== Broadcasting ===
In June 2010, he gave the last of three programmes called Home Thoughts From Abroad, a 15-minute episode on Radio 4. He claimed that Britain is becoming a more claustrophobic authoritarian society, and that Germans were not as disciplinarian as is often extolled, and more libertarian than commonly expected with a more healthy relationship with the state.

On 2 January 2009, he broadcast a 30-minute programme on Radio 4 called Anglomania.

== Personal life ==
Between 2004 and 2012, Jungclaussen served as Treasurer of the King Edward VII. Anglo-German Foundation.

He lives in London and Suffolk.
