= Alex Oshmyansky =

American radiologist (born 1984)

Alexander R. Oshmyansky
- Born: November 1984 (age 41); Denver, Colorado, U.S.
- Education: CU Boulder (BA); Duke University (MD); University of Oxford (DPhil)
- Occupations: Staff radiologist, Vision Radiology; Founder/CEO, Cost Plus Drugs
- Website: Cost Plus Drugs: Mission

Alexander Oshmyansky (born in November 1984) is an American radiologist who is co-founder and CEO of Mark Cuban Cost Plus Drug Company. He was included in Time magazine's 2024 list of the 100 most influential people in health.

== Biography ==
Oshmyansky was born in Denver, Colorado into a Jewish family of immigrants from the Soviet Union and grew up in Littleton, Colorado, about 9 miles south of Denver. He attended Dakota Ridge High School in Littleton.

Oshmyansky attended the University of Colorado Boulder, graduating at the age of 18 and majoring in biochemistry. He then attended Duke University for medicine. He also completed a DPhil (PhD) in mathematics at St. Cross College, University of Oxford as a Marshall Scholar.

He completed a surgical internship at Harvard Medical School / Brigham and Women’s Hospital and then a residency in diagnostic radiology followed by a pediatric radiology fellowship at Johns Hopkins Hospital. While in residency, he attended night school at UB School of Law for the 2013–2014 school year out of personal interest.

In 2018, he founded Osh Affordable Pharmaceuticals and shortly after, sent Mark Cuban a cold email asking him to invest. Cuban instead decided to financially back the entire company, and the name was changed to Mark Cuban Cost Plus Drug Company (MCCPDC), or more simply Cost Plus Drugs.

Oshmyansky is a staff radiologist at Vision Radiology, for which he performs teleradiology at multiple locations around the United States. He is affiliated with a number of medical institutions, such as St. Francis Hospital in Wilmington, Delaware and Atrium Health Wake Forest Baptist in Winston-Salem, North Carolina.

== Honors ==
Oshmyansky was included in Time's 2024 Top 100 most influential people in health.

== Personal life ==
Oshmyansky lives in Dallas with his wife.
