= Elizabeth Frood =

New Zealand Egyptologist and academic

Elizabeth Anne Frood (born 1975) is a New Zealand-born Egyptologist and academic, who specialises in self-presentation and the study of non-royals. Since 2006, she has been an associate professor of Egyptology at the University of Oxford. She has also served as director of its Griffith Institute and is a Fellow of St Cross College, Oxford.

== Biography ==
Frood became disabled in 2015. Following an infection which developed into sepsis, she lost part of her nose which has since been reconstructed, both her legs were amputated below the knee, and the hearing in one ear and the use of her hands was significantly impaired. After returning to work on a part-time basis in 2016, she undertook her first post-recovery fieldwork trip to Egypt in 2018. She wrote about her experience of returning to Egypt post-disability in her article "Returning to Egypt: acquired disability and fieldwork", for the University of Oxford website.

In 2020 she made her debut as a television presenter for the BBC, with the documentary "Tutankhamun in Colour" broadcast on BBC4. New colourising techniques were applied to original black and white footage, to explore the discovery of Tutankhamun’s tomb.

She has also fronted a fashion campaign for Kintsugi, an inclusive fashion brand that takes its name from the Japanese practice of repairing broken pottery with gold lacquer.

She is a member of the Editorial Board for Journal of Ancient History.

== Selected works ==
- Frood, Elizabeth (2007). Biographical texts from Ramessid Egypt. Atlanta: Society of Biblical Literature. ISBN 978-1-58983-210-7.
