= Dakota Ridge, Colorado =

Unincorporated community in Colorado, US

- Census-designated place
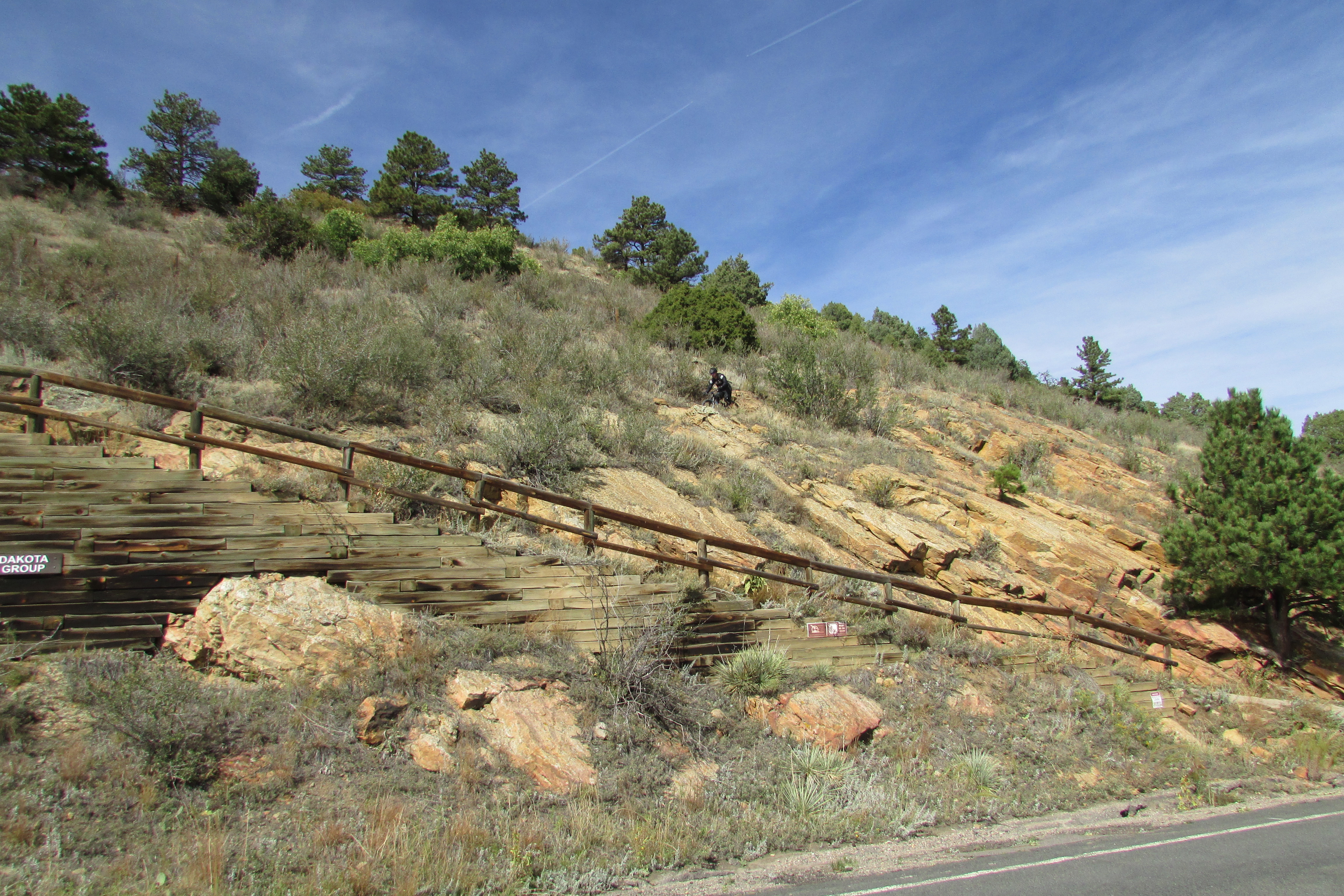
- Dakota Ridge trail access

- Location of the Dakota Ridge CDP in Jefferson County, Colorado
- Coordinates: 39°37′20″N 105°07′45″W
- Country: United States
- State: Colorado
- County: Jefferson

Government
  - Type: Unincorporated community
  - Body: Jefferson County

Area
  - Total: 9.685 sq mi (25.085 km^{2})
  - Land: 9.387 sq mi (24.311 km^{2})
  - Water: 0.299 sq mi (0.774 km^{2})
- Elevation: 5,768 ft (1,758 m)

Population (2020)
  - Total: 33,892
  - Density: 3,610.7/sq mi (1,394.1/km^{2})
- Time zone: UTC−07:00 (MST)
  - Summer (DST): UTC−06:00 (MDT)
- ZIP codes: Littleton 80127; Morrison 80465
- Area codes: 303/720/983
- GNIS CDP ID: 2583230
- FIPS code: 08-19150

Dakota Ridge is an unincorporated community and a census-designated place (CDP) located in and governed by Jefferson County, Colorado, United States. The CDP is a part of the Denver-Aurora-Centennial, CO Metropolitan Statistical Area. The population of the Dakota Ridge CDP was 33,892 at the United States Census 2020. In 1988, voters turned down a proposal to incorporate Dakota Ridge. The community lies in ZIP codes 80127 and 80465.

== Geography ==
Dakota Ridge is bordered to the east by Denver, to the north by Lakewood, and to the south by unincorporated Ken Caryl. It is bordered to the west by the Dakota Hogback, a sharp hogback ridge that to the north near Morrison is also known as Dinosaur Ridge.

Colorado State Highway 470, part of the beltway around the Denver metropolitan area, runs through the western part of the community, leading north to Golden and southeast to Highlands Ranch. Downtown Denver is 17 miles (27 km) to the northeast.

The Dakota Ridge CDP has an area of 6,199 acres (25.085 km^{2}), including 191 acres (0.774 km^{2}) of water.

== Demographics ==
The United States Census Bureau initially defined the Dakota Ridge CDP for the United States Census 2010.

Dakota Ridge CDP, Colorado
Year	Pop.	±%
2010	32,005	—
2020	33,892	+5.9%
Source: United States Census Bureau

=== 2020 census ===
As of the 2020 census, Dakota Ridge had a population of 33,892. The median age was 40.2 years. 21.7% of residents were under the age of 18 and 14.9% of residents were 65 years of age or older. For every 100 females there were 99.1 males, and for every 100 females age 18 and over there were 98.4 males age 18 and over.

99.7% of residents lived in urban areas, while 0.3% lived in rural areas.

There were 12,877 households in Dakota Ridge, of which 31.8% had children under the age of 18 living in them. Of all households, 58.2% were married-couple households, 15.1% were households with a male householder and no spouse or partner present, and 19.9% were households with a female householder and no spouse or partner present. About 20.1% of all households were made up of individuals and 7.7% had someone living alone who was 65 years of age or older.

There were 13,182 housing units, of which 2.3% were vacant. The homeowner vacancy rate was 0.5% and the rental vacancy rate was 5.8%.

Racial composition as of the 2020 census
Race	Number	Percent
White	27,618	81.5%
Black or African American	312	0.9%
American Indian and Alaska Native	252	0.7%
Asian	1,149	3.4%
Native Hawaiian and Other Pacific Islander	31	0.1%
Some other race	989	2.9%
Two or more races	3,541	10.4%
Hispanic or Latino (of any race)	4,446	13.1%

== Education ==
Dakota Ridge is served by the Jefferson County Public Schools.

== See also ==
- Front Range Urban Corridor
