= ProjectScotland =

ProjectScotland is a Scottish volunteering organisation allowing 16- to 30-year-olds to volunteer with a local charity or non-profit organisation. All placements are approximately 20–30 hours per week and last for a minimum of 3 months. To date, ProjectScotland has placed more than 5,000 young people, who have in turn completed over 3 million hours' worth of volunteering throughout Scotland.

The volunteering opportunities help young people unlock their potential and take part in meaningful youth social action, but also have a multiplier effect by benefiting hundreds of charities across Scotland, local communities and Scotland's Third Sector.

ProjectScotland provide all of their volunteers with critical developmental support including help with travel expenses; a local mentor to help them set and achieve goals, before, during and after placement; and access to ProjectScotland's employability workshop programme which held throughout the year across Scotland.

Project Scotland's main aims at both a local and national level are to:

- support all young people throughout Scotland to get on in life regardless of age, stage or qualifications;
- significantly increase the employability chances of young people through growing their skills and experience;
- help young people give back to their communities, encouraging a culture of volunteering for Scotland's youth;
- promote the benefits of investing in the young people of Scotland long term,
- support and increase the capacity of local charity organisations and Scotland's Third Sector.

ProjectScotland was inspired by the AmeriCorps organisation and in 2005 it was founded by Julia Ogilvy. Current CEO is Paul Reddish.

In 2021 the organisation merged with Volunteering Matters.

== Volunteers ==
ProjectScotland provides 16- to 30-year-olds, living in Scotland, an opportunity to volunteer with a charity.

In return for their time, volunteers get experience of work, skills and an opportunity to contribute to their community.

Young people across Scotland choose to volunteer with the support from ProjectScotland for a number of reasons, including:

- build experience and skills while growing their confidence;
- make a difference to others and discover what sort of job they want;
- meet people, have fun and be part of their community,
- help a charity do more while they learn what they are good at.

== Mentors ==
Each volunteer is offered a mentor to help them get the most from their volunteering. The Mentor is not their line manager or another person they have to impress, instead mentors are someone who is completely on their side to support, encourage, listen and guide them.

Mentors will help them reflect on the young persons volunteering experience, enabling them to turn up the volume on their skills and resources, which in turn will help them work out what they want to do in the future. The support mentors can offer is invaluable, from providing CV advice, interview preparation, to goal setting, and confidence building.

== Partners ==
ProjectScotland is partnered with nearly 550 charities in Scotland, at a national and local level. These include Marie Curie, Glasgow Wood Recycling, Health in Mind, Four Square Scotland and Oxfam.
