= Andrew Goudie (geographer) =

English geographer (1945–2026)

- Born: Andrew Shaw Goudie; 21 August 1945
- Died: 8 October 2026 (aged 81)
- Education: Trinity Hall, Cambridge
- Occupation: Geographer

Andrew Shaw Goudie (21 August 1945 – 8 October 2026) was an English geographer at the University of Oxford who specialised in desert geomorphology, dust storms, weathering, and climatic change in the tropics. He was also known for his teaching and best-selling textbooks on human impacts on the environment. Goudie was the author, co-author, editor, or co-editor of forty-one books (many of which have appeared in numerous editions) and more than 200 papers published in learned journals. He combined research and some teaching with administrative roles.

== Life and career ==
Goudie was educated at Dean Close School and Trinity Hall, Cambridge (BA first class with distinction 1967, MA, PhD 1972).

Goudie was at the School of Geography and the Environment, University of Oxford from 1970 to 2003. He was appointed fellow of Hertford College in 1976, was professor of geography in 1984 and was head of the School of Geography from 1984 until 1994. From 1995 until 1997, he was president of the Oxford Development Programme and pro-vice-chancellor of the university. He was a master of St Cross College, Oxford from 2003 to 2011. He has been an honorary secretary and vice president of the Royal Geographical Society, executive secretary and chairman of the British Geomorphical Research Group, a member of the council of the Institute of British Geographers, and president of the Geographical Association.

In 1970, Goudie was elected a Member of the Institute of British Geographers (of which he was later a member of council) and a Fellow of the Royal Geographical Society. He was honorary secretary of the Royal Geographical Society from 1980 until 1988 and was a vice-president of the Society. He was also president of the Geographical Association and of the International Association of Geomorphologists and served as a delegate to Oxford University Press.

Goudie died on 8 October 2026, aged 81.

== Publications ==
- Andrew S. Goudie, Geomorphology in the Anthropocene (Cambridge University Press, 2017, ISBN 9781107139961)
- Andrew S. Goudie, Great Desert Explorers (Silphum Press, Royal Geographical Society, 2016, ISBN 978-1-900971-45-4)
- Andrew S. Goudie, Wheels Across The Desert: Exploration Of The Libyan Desert By Motorcar 1916-1942 (Silphum Press, The Society for Libyan Studies, 2008, ISBN 978-1-900971-07-2)
- David E. Anderson, Andrew S. Goudie, and Adrian G. Parker, Global Environments through the Quaternary: Exploring Environmental Change (4th edn, Oxford University Press, 2007, ISBN 0198742266, ISBN 9780198742265).
- Andrew S. Goudie and N.J. Middleton, Desert Dust in the Global System (Heidelberg: Springer, 2006), article abstract, ISBN 9783540323549, ebook: ISBN 978-3-540-32355-6)
- Andrew S. Goudie, The Human Impact On The Natural Environment: Past, Present, And Future (Oxford: Blackwell, 1981; 2nd edn 1986; 3rd edn 1990; 4th edn 1993; 5th edn 2000; 6th edn 2006, ISBN 9781405127042)
- Andrew S. Goudie, ed., Encyclopedia of Geomorphology (London: Routledge, 2004, ISBN 0415863007 ISBN 9780415863001).
- Andrew S. Goudie, editor-in-chief, and David J. Cuff, associate editor, Encyclopedia of Global Change: Environmental Change and Human Society (Oxford University Press, 2002, ISBN 9780195108255)
- Andrew S. Goudie, Great Warm Deserts of the World: Landscapes and Evolution (Oxford University Press, 2002, ISBN 9780199245154)
- Andrew S. Goudie, The Nature Of The Environment (Oxford: Blackwell, 1984; 2nd edn 1989; 3rd edn 1993; 4th edn 2001, ISBN 978-1-444-31234-8)
- David S.G. Thomas and Andrew Goudie, eds, The Dictionary Of Physical Geography (Oxford: Blackwell, 1985; 2nd edn 1994; 3rd edn 2000, ISBN 978-1-118-68743-7)
- Andrew S. Goudie, Ian Livingstone, and Stephen Stokes, eds, Aeolian Environments, Sediments, and Landforms (Chichester: Wiley, 1999)
- Andrew S. Goudie and Bilin Neyapti, Conflict and Growth in Africa, Vol. 3, Southern Africa (Paris: Development Centre of the Organisation for Economic Co-operation and Development, 1999)
- Denys Brunsden and Andrew S. Goudie, Classic Landforms of the West Dorset Coast (Sheffield: Geographical Association, 1997; new edn 1997)
- Andrew S. Goudie, Climate (London: Phoenix, 1997)
- Andrew S. Goudie and Heather Viles, The Earth Transformed: An Introduction To Human Impacts On The Environment (Oxford: Blackwell, 1997)
- Andrew S. Goudie, ed., The Human Impact Reader: Readings and Case Studies (Oxford: Blackwell, 1997)
- Andrew S. Goudie and Heather A. Viles, Salt Weathering Hazards (Chichester: Wiley, 1997)
- W.M. Adams, Andrew S. Goudie and A.R. Orme, eds, The Physical Geography of Africa (Oxford University Press, 1996)
- Andrew Goudie and Adrian Parker, The Geomorphology of the Cotswolds (Oxford: Cotteswold Naturalists' Field Club, 1996)
- Andrew S. Goudie, The Changing Earth: Rates of Geomorphological Pprocesses (Oxford: Blackwell, 1995)
- Andrew S. Goudie, Deserts in a Warmer World (Chichester: Wiley, 1994)
- Andrew S. Goudie and Denys Brunsden, The Environment of the British Isles: An Atlas (Oxford: Clarendon Press, 1994)
- Andrew S. Goudie et al., eds, Geomorphological Techniques (London: Unwin Hyman, 1990; 2nd edn, London: Routledge, 1994)
- Ron Cooke, Andrew Warren, and Andrew S. Goudie, Desert Geomorphology (London: UCL Press, 1993)
- Andrew S. Goudie and Rita Gardner, Discovering Landscape in England & Wales (London: Allen & Unwin, 1985; 2nd edn, London: Chapman & Hall, 1992)
- Andrew S. Goudie, Environmental Change (Oxford: Clarendon Press, 1977; 2nd edn 1983; 3rd edn 1992)
- Alisdair Rogers, Heather Viles, and Andrew S. Goudie, eds, The Student's Companion to Geography (Oxford: Blackwell, 1992)
- Andrew S. Goudie and Andrew Watson, Desert Geomorphology (Basingstoke: Macmillan Education, 1980; 2nd edn 1990)
- Andrew S. Goudie, The Landforms of England and Wales (Oxford: Basil Blackwell, 1990)
- Andrew S. Goudie, ed., Techniques for Desert Reclamation (Chichester: Wiley, 1990)
- J.T. Harmse, P.G. Olivier, and Andrew S. Goudie, eds, A Bibliography on Pans and Related Deposits (Johannesburg: University Press, Rand Afrikaans University, 1990)
- Andrew S. Goudie, The search for Timbuktu: A View of Deserts: An Inaugural Lecture Delivered Before the University of Oxford on 25 October 1985 (Oxford: Clarendon Press, 1986)
- Andrew S. Goudie, Salt Weathering (Oxford: University of Oxford School of Geography, 1985)
- Andrew S. Goudie, ed., Seven Hundred Years of an Oxford College: Hertford College, 1284–1984 (Oxford: Hertford College, 1984)
- Andrew S. Goudie and D. Price Williams, The Atlas of Swaziland (Lobamba: Swaziland National Trust Commission, 1983)
- Andrew S. Goudie and Kenneth Pye, eds, Chemical Sediments and Geomorphology: Precipitates and Residua in the Near-Surface Environment (London: Academic Press, 1983)
- Denys Brunsden and Andrew S. Goudie, Classic Coastal Landforms of Dorset (Sheffield: Geographical Association, 1981)
- Bridget Allchin, Andrew S. Goudie, and Karunarkara Hegde, The Prehistory and Palaeogeography of the Great Indian Desert (London; New York: Academic Press, 1978)
- Andrew S. Goudie and John Wilkinson, The Warm Desert Environment (Cambridge: Cambridge University Press, 1977)
- Andrew S. Goudie, The Concept of Post-glacial Progressive Desiccation (Oxford: School of Geography, University of Oxford, 1972)
- Andrew S. Goudie, Duricrusts in Tropical and Subtropical Landscapes (Oxford: Clarendon Press, 1973)

== Awards ==
- 2007 Geological Society of America's Farouk El-Baz Award for Desert Research
- 2002 Medal from the Royal Academy of Belgium
- 2002 DSc awarded by the University of Oxford
- 1991 Founders' Medal of the Royal Geographical Society
- 1991 Mungo Park Medal by the Royal Scottish Geographical Society
