= Steven Casey =

Dr. Steven Casey
- Education: University of East Anglia; University of Oxford

Steven Casey is a professor of international history at the London School of Economics. He is an expert on 20th-century American history and foreign policy.

== Biography ==
Casey received his undergraduate degree from the University of East Anglia in 1994 before he moved to Oxford, where he completed an MPhil (Master of Philosophy) and a Ph.D. in International Relations as a Truman Scholar. Casey worked as a Junior Research Fellow and Tutor in Politics at Trinity College, Oxford, from 1998 to 2001. Casey has lectured at the London School of Economics since 2001.

Casey has published numerous articles and books on the Korean War and World War II as well as contributing on radio and television programs for the American cable channel C-SPAN. Casey's primary research interests lie in US foreign policy after 1933 and the relationship between the US media and the military during World War II. He served as a visiting scholar to the John Curtin Prime Ministerial Library as well as a Fellow of the Australian Prime Ministers Centre, in Canberra, kn 2008.

Casey is the recipient of the Harry S. Truman Book Award and the Neustad Prize for his work on the Korean War.

== Selected bibliography ==
- The United States after unipolarity: Obama’s alliances (2011). LSE IDEAS, London School of Economics and Political Science, London, UK
- Casualty reporting and domestic support for war: the U.S. experience during the Korean War (2010). Journal of Strategic Studies, 33 (2)
- Selling the Korean War: propaganda, politics, and public opinion in the United States, 1950-1953 (2008). Oxford University Press, Oxford, UK
- "The campaign to sell a harsh peace for Germany to the American public, 1944–1948" (2005). History, 90 (297)
- Propaganda in the Korean War. In: Cull, Nicholas and Culbert, David and Welch, David, (eds.) Propaganda and mass persuasion (2003). ABC-CLIO, Santa Barbara, USA
- Cautious crusade: Franklin D. Roosevelt, American public opinion, and the war against Nazi Germany (2001). Oxford University Press, New York
