= Mary Francesca Bosworth =

Australian criminologist

- Education: University of Western Australia
- Writing career
- Language: English
- Genre: Criminology
- Website: bordercriminologies.law.ox.ac.uk

Mary Francesca Bosworth is Professor of Criminology at the University of Oxford where she founded and co-directs the international research network Border Criminologies. She is the author of a number of books, including Engendering Resistance: Agency and Power in Women’s Prisons (1999), Explaining U.S. Imprisonment (2010), (with Carolyn Hoyle) the edited book What is Criminology? (2011), (with Katja Aas) the edited book The Borders of Punishment (2013), Inside Immigration Detention (2014), Bordered Lives (2020) with Khadija von Zinnenburg Carrol and Christoph Balzar, and Supply Chain Justice (2025). From 2009 to 2024 Mary Bosworth was the UK Editor-in-Chief of the journal Theoretical Criminology.

== Life ==
Bosworth studied arts at the University of Western Australia. She then attended the University of Cambridge where she gained an MPhil and a doctoral degree in criminology. She worked in the United States for eight years, returning to the United Kingdom in 2004. She is currently Professor of Criminology and Fellow of St Cross College at the University of Oxford in England.

== Work ==
Bosworth has published a number of papers and books on race, gender and citizenship, particularly on prisons and immigration detention. Her research is international and comparative. She has worked in Paris, Britain, the US and Australia. In all her work Bosworth examines how individuals negotiate the institutional constraints of their confinement and how that confinement reinforces and is reinforced by their prior experience of poverty, violence and abuse. In summer 2012 Bosworth was awarded a 5-year European Research Council Starter Grant.

== Bibliography ==
- Mary Bosworth (1999). Engendering resistance: agency and power in women's prisons. Ashgate. ISBN 1-84014-739-3.
- Mary Bosworth (2002). The U.S. federal prison system. SAGE. ISBN 0-7619-2304-7.
- Mary Bosworth (2005). Encyclopedia of prisons and correctional facilities. Sage Publications. ISBN 0-7619-2731-X.
- Mary Bosworth, Jeanne Flavin (2007). Race, gender, and punishment: from colonialism to the war on terror. Rutgers University Press. ISBN 978-0-8135-3904-1.
- Mary Bosworth (2010). Explaining U.S. Imprisonment. SAGE. ISBN 978-1-4129-2487-0.
- Mary Bosworth, Carolyn Hoyle (2011). What Is Criminology?. Oxford University Press US. ISBN 978-0-19-957182-6.
- Katja Aas, Mary Bosworth (2013). Borders of Punishment: Migration, Citizenship and Social Exclusion. Oxford University Press, UK. ISBN 978-0-19-966939-4.
