= Anne Ulrich =

German biochemist (born 1966)

- Born: December 31, 1966 (age 59); Hamburg, Germany
- Citizenship: German
- Education: University of Oxford
- Scientific career
- Fields: Biochemistry, Biophysics
- Workplaces: Karlsruhe Institute of Technology
- Website: www.ibg.kit.edu/nmr

Anne S. Ulrich (born December 31, 1966) is a German chemist. She is the director of the Institute of Biological Interfaces (IBG-2) and Chair of Biochemistry at the Karlsruhe Institute of Technology.

== Education ==
She studied chemistry at the University of Oxford - continued her doctoral work in the laboratory of Anthony Watts - held subsequent research positions as an EMBO-Fellow with Hartmut Oschkinat at the European Molecular Biology Laboratory in Heidelberg and as a Liebig-Fellow with Felix Wieland at the University of Heidelberg - became Associate Professor at the University of Jena - until she moved her group in 2002 to the Karlsruhe Institute of Technology.

== Research ==
Her research focuses on the structural and functional analysis of biomembranes by solid state NMR. The main systems of interest are:

- Mechanisms of membrane-active peptides with antimicrobial, cell-penetrating, fusogenic, or cytotoxic functions
- Helix-helix interactions of transmembrane segments from signalling receptors, ion channels, and protein translocation systems
- Self-assembly of amyloidogenic peptides and "charge-zipper" proteins in membranes

== Personal ==
Ulrich comes from a family with strong scientific background.
