= History (journal) =

History: The Journal of the Historical Association
- Language: English
- Edited by: Daniel Laqua; Department of Humanities at Northumbria University

Publication details
- History: 1912–present
- Publisher: Wiley-Blackwell on behalf of the Historical Association (United Kingdom)
- Frequency: 5/year

Standard abbreviations
- ISO 4: History

Indexing
- ISSN: 0018-2648 (print); 1468-229X (web)
- LCCN: 14014748
- OCLC no.: 466923053

Links
- Journal homepage

History: The Journal of the Historical Association is a peer-reviewed academic journal published five times per year by Wiley-Blackwell on behalf of the UK's Historical Association (HA). Having been founded in 1912, History became the HA's journal in 1916. It publishes original articles, book reviews and historiographial surveys ("State of the Field" articles), covering all areas of historical scholarship. Since 2024, it is being edited by a committee based at Northumbria University in Newcastle upon Tyne. The journal also maintains a blog on the HA website.
