= Cost Plus Drugs =

Online pharmacy in Texas

- Type: Private
- Industry: Pharmaceuticals
- Founders: Alex Oshmyansky and Mark Cuban
- Headquarters: Dallas, Texas, US
- Key people: Alex Oshmyansky and Mark Cuban
- Website: costplusdrugs.com

Mark Cuban Cost Plus Drug Company (MCCPDC), doing business as Cost Plus Drugs, is an American public benefit corporation, founded in 2022 with its main headquarters located in Dallas, Texas. The company is focused on the pharmacy distribution of drugs with a stated goal to lower the prices for generic drugs by removing middlemen, such as pharmacy benefit managers, and by moving to a cost-plus pricing strategy.

== Origins and concept ==
Cost Plus Drugs was launched in January 2022. It was co-founded by radiologist Alex Oshmyansky and billionaire Mark Cuban. According to Cuban, in 2018, Oshmyansky contacted Cuban with an email titled "cold pitch" in which he asked Cuban to invest in a pharmacy he envisioned to manufacture generic drugs and skip the middleman wholesalers. The company has said that the intermediary layer of the pharmacy benefit managers is typically responsible for the heavy markup that drugs see between the manufacturers and the customers. The company originally used Truepill Pharmacy to fill prescriptions, but later transitioned to HealthDyne. Prices are direct to consumer, without any need or role for insurance.

== Operations and scale ==
Oshmyansky is the founder and CEO. The manufacturing facility, constructed in the Deep Ellum area of Dallas, Texas, was completed in 2023 and features a 22,000 square foot sterile facility that features top-of-the-line aseptic robotic filling lines to ensure that both injectable medication and drugs listed on the FDA Drug Shortages list meet the demand of the population.

While originally built as a direct-to-patient pharmacy, MCCPDC built its own "Marketplace" in 2024. This "Marketplace" essentially serves a wholesale business that sells medications directly to surgery centers, outpatient clinics, hospitals, retail pharmacies, and long-term care facilities. While this segment of the MCCPDC stocks many medications, the focus remains on being able to provide injectables which are commonly seen in shortages.

Franklin, Tennessee based Community Health System (CHS) was the first health system to partner with MCCPDC's "Marketplace." In this business partnership MCCPDC shipped multiple packages of epinephrine and norepinephrine to nine CHS hospitals. After seeing success with this business model, CHS expanded its relationship with the organization by adding an additional 62 hospitals, ScionHealth (Louisville, Kentucky) joined as the second inaugural partner in May 2024, reaching 94 hospitals.

Furthermore, in March 2026, MCCPDC in collaboration with GraphiteRx officially integrates its pricing inside already-existing hospital procurement workflows, allowing in-house pharmacists to see a side-by-side comparison of MCCPDC prices compared to traditional wholesalers.

As of June 2022, the company had a selection of over 100 generic drugs, and by March 2023, over 350 drugs were available. In December 2023, the company had over 2200 drugs available. As of 2026, The drugs are sold for a price equivalent to the company's cost plus 15% markup, a $5 pharmacy service fee, and a $5.25 shipping fee. The company ships to all 50 US states.

== See also ==
- GoodRx
- TrumpRx
- Prescription drug prices in the United States
