= 2014 Jefferson County Public Schools protests =

School curriculum protest in Colorado, United States

The 2014 Jefferson County Public Schools protests were a series of demonstrations against the new AP United States History (APUSH) curriculum in Jefferson County in the U.S. state of Colorado. Protests began on Friday, September 19, 2014, at Standley Lake and Conifer high schools when classes were cancelled at both schools because a high number of teachers called in absent to work. On September 22, the protests spread to Evergreen when students left class on marched on the Jefferson County Schools Education Center. On September 23, the protests spread to Pomona, Arvada, and Ralston Valley high schools. Two days later, the protest grew to about 1,000 when Columbine and Dakota Ridge students joined together on a pedestrian bridge over South Wadsworth Boulevard.

The protests were rooted in the election of a new Jefferson County Public Schools board in November 2013. The board's conservative majority of three, headed by chairman Ken Witt, appointed Dan McMinimee as superintendent and allotted funds to save two failing charter schools. Many students, parents, and teachers also protested the APUSH curriculum review proposed by the board, which wrote, "Materials should promote citizenship, patriotism, essentials and benefits of the free enterprise system, respect for authority and respect for individual rights. Materials should not encourage or condone civil disorder, social strife or disregard of the law."

While demonstrating, students skipped lunch and free time; they were honked at by drivers outside Lakewood. The National Coalition Against Censorship, the American Civil Liberties Union of Colorado, and the National Council for the Social Studies sent letters to the Jefferson County Board of Education members stating their opposition to the proposal. On September 25, the school's superintendent's children were threatened by the demonstrators; the Jefferson County Sheriff's Office investigated.

Some in the conservative media thought the teachers were encouraging their pupils to skip class and protest, but according to one of the leaders of the Columbine High School protests, as well as other students and teachers, that is untrue. Both Fox News commentator Megyn Kelly and Tea Party officials pejoratively referred to the students as "pawns", prompting backlash from the Jefferson County community. On October 2, 2014, The Washington Post interviewed Kyle Ferris, who said the community was disappointed with the school board and felt the need to exercise their rights as American citizens. The same day, the committee approved a new proposal, which prompted over 100 people to attend a rally at Wadsworth Boulevard.
