= Jefferson Academy =

Jefferson Academy may refer to:

- Jefferson Academy Charter School, a charter school in Jefferson County, Colorado
- Jefferson Academy (Monticello, Florida), a former school
- Martin Institute, formerly known as Jefferson Academy in Jefferson, Georgia
- Vincennes University, a university in Vincennes, Indiana formerly known as Jefferson Academy
