= Fairmount, Colorado =

Census-designated place in Jefferson County, Colorado, United States

- Census-designated place
- Location of the Fairmount CDP in Jefferson County, Colorado
- Coordinates: 39°47′35″N 105°10′16″W
- Country: United States
- State: Colorado
- County: Jefferson

Government
  - Type: unincorporated community
  - Body: Jefferson County

Area
  - Total: 6.281 sq mi (16.267 km^{2})
  - Land: 6.084 sq mi (15.758 km^{2})
  - Water: 0.197 sq mi (0.509 km^{2})
- Elevation: 5,591 ft (1,704 m)

Population (2020)
  - Total: 9,324
  - Density: 1,532/sq mi (591.7/km^{2})
- Time zone: UTC−07:00 (MST)
  - Summer (DST): UTC−06:00 (MDT)
- ZIP code: golden 80403
- Area codes: 303/720/983
- GNIS CDP ID: 2583234
- FIPS code: 08-25550

Fairmount is an unincorporated community and a census-designated place (CDP) located in and governed by Jefferson County, Colorado, United States. The CDP is a part of the Denver-Aurora-Centennial, CO Metropolitan Statistical Area. The population of the Fairmount CDP was 9,324 at the United States Census 2020.

== History ==
Fairmount has never had its own post office. The Golden, Colorado, post office (ZIP code 80403) serves the area.

== Geography ==
Fairmount is bordered to the north by Arvada, to the east by Wheat Ridge, to the south by unincorporated Applewood, and to the west by Golden and undeveloped land on North Table Mountain.

The southeast corner of the Fairmount CDP touches Interstate 70, which leads east 8 miles (13 km) into Denver.

At the 2020 United States Census, the Fairmount CDP had an area of 4,020 acres (16.267 km^{2}), including 126 acres (0.509 km^{2}) of water.

== Demographics ==
The United States Census Bureau initially defined the Fairmount CDP for the United States Census 2010.

Fairmount CDP, Colorado
Year	Pop.	±%
2010	7,559	—
2020	9,324	+23.3%
Source: United States Census Bureau

=== 2020 census ===
As of the 2020 census, Fairmount had a population of 9,324. The median age was 44.5 years. 22.3% of residents were under the age of 18 and 20.4% were 65 years of age or older. For every 100 females there were 102.3 males, and for every 100 females age 18 and over there were 100.9 males age 18 and over.

100.0% of residents lived in urban areas, while 0.0% lived in rural areas.

There were 3,482 households in Fairmount, of which 31.6% had children under the age of 18 living in them. Of all households, 67.9% were married-couple households, 13.4% were households with a male householder and no spouse or partner present, and 14.2% were households with a female householder and no spouse or partner present. About 15.8% of all households were made up of individuals and 8.0% had someone living alone who was 65 years of age or older.

There were 3,548 housing units, of which 1.9% were vacant. The homeowner vacancy rate was 0.4% and the rental vacancy rate was 4.3%.

Racial composition as of the 2020 census
Race	Number	Percent
White	8,165	87.6%
Black or African American	34	0.4%
American Indian and Alaska Native	31	0.3%
Asian	217	2.3%
Native Hawaiian and Other Pacific Islander	4	0.0%
Some other race	159	1.7%
Two or more races	714	7.7%
Hispanic or Latino (of any race)	635	6.8%

== Education ==
Fairmount is served by the Jefferson County Public Schools.

== See also ==
- Front Range Urban Corridor
