= Long View High School =

Location
- 13301 West 2nd Place; Lakewood, Colorado 80228; United States; 39°42′46″N 105°9′7″W

Information
- School type: Alternative high school
- Motto: Connected, Supported, Proud
- Established: 1994
- School district: Jefferson County R-1
- CEEB code: 060674
- NCES School ID: 080480000988
- Principal: Andrew Freza
- Teaching staff: 5.03 (on an FTE basis)
- Grades: 10–12
- Gender: Coeducational
- Enrollment: 25 (2023–24)
- Student to teacher ratio: 4.97
- Campus type: Suburban, Large
- Colors: Purple and white
- Mascot: Javelina
- Website: longview.jeffcopublicschools.org

Long View High School, located in Lakewood, Colorado, United States, is a small alternative Jefferson County public school, the smallest comprehensive public school in the Denver metropolitan area. Long View was started in 1994 as an educational option within Jefferson County Public Schools. It is designed to serve high school students, grades 10–12, whose needs are not being met by traditional, comprehensive high schools.
