= Ed DeGeorge =

American football player and coach (born 1942)

Current position
- Title: Assistant coach
- Team: Beloit
- Conference: MWC

Biographical details
- Born: 1942 (age 83–84); Butte, Montana, U.S.

Playing career

Football
- 1961–1964: Colorado College

Coaching career (HC unless noted)

Football
- 1966: Alameda HS (CO) (assistant)
- 1967–1976: Colorado College (DC)
- 1977–2005: Beloit

Baseball
- 2018–present: Beloit (assistant)

Administrative career (AD unless noted)
- 1985–2004: Beloit

Head coaching record
- Overall: 135–135–1

Accomplishments and honors

Championships
- 6 MWC North Division (1984, 1990–1992, 1994–1995)

Edward J. DeGeorge Jr. (born 1942) is an American college baseball coach and former college football coach. He is an assistant baseball coach for Beloit College, a position he has held since 2018. He was the head football coach for Beloit College from 1977 to 2005, and for some years also served as the college's athletic director. He also coached for Alameda High School and Colorado College. He played college football for Colorado College.

== Head coaching record ==
Year	Team	Overall	Conference	Standing	Bowl/playoffs
Beloit Buccaneers (Midwest Conference) (1977–2005)
1977	Beloit	0–9	0–4	5th (East)	
1978	Beloit	4–4	3–1	2nd (Blue)	
1979	Beloit	4–4	2–2	T–2nd (Blue)	
1980	Beloit	4–4–1	3–4–1	7th	
1981	Beloit	4–5	3–5	T–6th	
1982	Beloit	5–4	2–2	3rd (North)	
1983	Beloit	2–7	1–3	4th (North)	
1984	Beloit	8–2	6–1	T–1st (North)	
1985	Beloit	5–4	3–4	T–3rd (North)	
1986	Beloit	4–5	3–4	T–3rd (North)	
1987	Beloit	1–8	0–7	5th (North)	
1988	Beloit	6–3	4–2	2nd (North)	
1989	Beloit	6–3	3–3	2nd (North)	
1990	Beloit	8–2	6–0	1st (North)	
1991	Beloit	9–1	4–0	1st (North)	
1992	Beloit	6–3	4–1	T–1st (North)	
1993	Beloit	3–6	3–2	T–2nd (North)	
1994	Beloit	7–3	4–1	T–1st (North)	
1995	Beloit	8–1	4–1	T–1st (North)	
1996	Beloit	0–9	0–5	6th (North)	
1997	Beloit	3–6	2–3	T–3rd (North)	
1998	Beloit	7–3	7–2	T–2nd	
1999	Beloit	7–3	6–3	T–3rd	
2000	Beloit	3–7	3–6	T–6th	
2001	Beloit	3–7	2–6	T–7th	
2002	Beloit	6–4	5–4	T–4th	
2003	Beloit	4–6	3–6	T–5th	
2004	Beloit	3–7	2–7	8th	
2005	Beloit	5–5	5–4	T–4th	
Beloit:		135–135–1	93–93–1		
Total:		135–135–1			
National championship Conference title Conference division title or championship game berth
