= Mission Ballroom =

Concert venue in Denver, Colorado

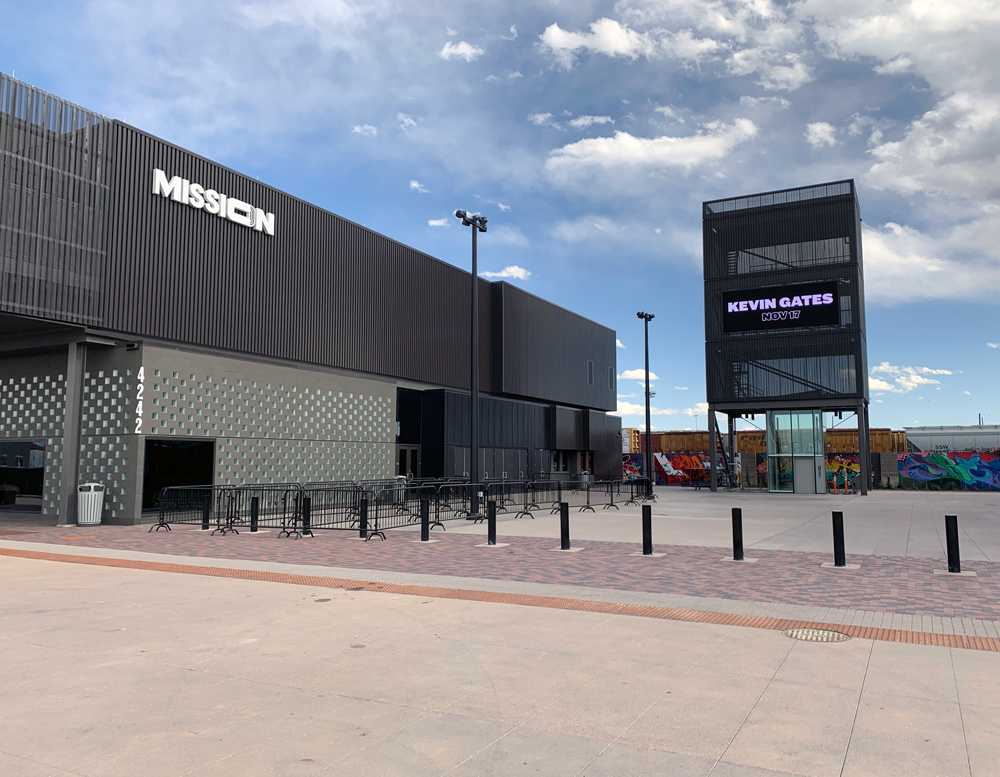
- Exterior of the venue (c. 2019)
- Interactive map of Mission Ballroom
- Former names: AEG RiNo Concert Hall (planning/construction)
- Address: 4242 Wynkoop Street
- Location: Denver, Colorado, U.S.
- Coordinates: 39°46′33″N 104°58′10″W
- Operator: AEG Presents Rocky Mountains
- Capacity: 3,950

Construction
- Groundbreaking: April 2018
- Opened: August 7, 2019
- Architect: Works Progress Architecture
- Project manager: Westfield Development
- Structural engineers: Martin/Martin, Inc.; S. A. Miro, Inc.
- General contractor: Mortenson Construction

Website
- missionballroom.com

The Mission Ballroom is an indoor concert venue in the River North Art District (RiNo) area of Denver, Colorado. Operated by AEG Presents Rocky Mountains, the 60,000 square feet (5,600 m^{2}) venue opened in August 2019 and has a maximum capacity of approximately 3,950 patrons. Developed over more than a decade, Mission Ballroom was designed as a purpose-built, mid-sized music venue and serves as one of Denver’s primary concert halls for nationally touring artists.

== Planning and development ==
The project was spearheaded by Chuck Morris, chief executive officer of AEG Presents Rocky Mountains and Pacific Northwest, along with co-presidents Don Strasburg and Brent Fedrizzi. Planning began in the late 2000s, following AEG’s assessment that Denver lacked a purpose-built venue that they owned and was capable of accommodating artists who were too large for theaters but not large enough for arena-scale shows. Company executives indicated that acquiring the Fillmore Auditorium was not a viable option, leading AEG to pursue a new, purpose-built facility. After evaluating numerous sites over nearly a decade, AEG selected a location at 4242 Wynkoop Street, on the northeastern edge of RiNo near the historic Denver Coliseum.

Mission Ballroom was publicly announced in April 2018, with construction beginning shortly thereafter. Financing was provided by FirstBank, and the project was developed in partnership with Westfield Development as an anchor component of their 14 acres (5.7 ha) North Wynkoop mixed-use redevelopment plans. The Denver Post estimated construction costs at approximately $40 million.

== Design ==
Mission Ballroom was designed by the Portland-based firm Works Progress Architecture with an emphasis on adaptability, acoustics, and sightlines. In interviews, Morris cited Red Rocks Amphitheatre, Brooklyn Steel, and The Anthem as influences, particularly for their emphasis on acoustics, audience immersion, and tiered sightlines.

The interior is organized around a bowl-shaped configuration with largely column-free sightlines, allowing unobstructed views from multiple seating and standing arrangements. A central design feature is a movable stage mounted on trolleys, enabling the performance area to shift longitudinally within the hall. This system allows the venue’s capacity to range from approximately 2,200 patrons for smaller shows to its full capacity of 3,950 for large-scale concerts.

The venue’s sound system was designed by d&b audiotechnik and incorporates noise-cancellation and sound-mitigation technology intended to reduce reflected sound and distortion within the performance space.

== Opening ==
Mission Ballroom officially opened on August 7, 2019, with an inaugural performance by The Lumineers. Opening-week programming included performances by artists such as Trey Anastasio Band, Gregory Alan Isakov, and Ben Harper, the Steve Miller Band, and Herbie Hancock with Kamasi Washington.
