= Keli McGregor =

American football player (1963–2010)

No. 83, 89
- Position: Tight end

Personal information
- Born: January 23, 1963; Primghar, Iowa, U.S.
- Died: April 20, 2010 (aged 47); Salt Lake City, Utah, U.S.
- Listed height: 6 ft 6 in (1.98 m)
- Listed weight: 250 lb (113 kg)

Career information
- High school: Lakewood (Colorado)
- College: Colorado State
- NFL draft: 1985: 4th round, 110th overall pick

Career history
- Denver Broncos (1985); Indianapolis Colts (1985); Seattle Seahawks (1987)*
- * Offseason or practice squad member only

Awards and highlights
- Second-team All-American (1984); Third-team All-American (1983); 2× Second-team All-WAC (1983, 1984)
- Stats at Pro Football Reference

Other information
- Baseball career

Teams
- As president: Colorado Rockies (2001–2010)

Career highlights and awards
- "KSM" retired by Colorado Rockies

Keli Scott McGregor (January 23, 1963 – April 20, 2010) was an American professional football player and baseball executive. McGregor played in the National Football League (NFL) for the Denver Broncos and Indianapolis Colts. He was president of the Colorado Rockies of Major League Baseball (MLB).

== Early life and college ==
McGregor was a multi-sport athlete at Lakewood High School in Lakewood, Colorado, before enrolling at Colorado State University (CSU) to play college football for the Colorado State Rams as a tight end. McGregor was a four-year starter for the Rams. Considered to be an undersized halfback when he arrived on campus, McGregor went from freshman walk-on to a two-time All-American. He grew to 6 feet 8 inches (2.03 m) and 250 pounds (110 kg) and went on to become an all-Western Athletic Conference tight end from 1982 to 1984. He set a single-season school record with 69 catches in 1983, a mark that stood for ten years. He was voted to Colorado State's all-century team in 1992 and was named to the CSU Hall of Fame in 1996.

== Professional career ==
The Denver Broncos selected McGregor in the fourth round, with the 110th overall pick, of the 1985 NFL draft. He played for the Broncos and the Indianapolis Colts during the 1985 NFL season.

== Coaching and management ==
Following his retirement from football, McGregor then embarked on a career in sports administration. While he earned a master's degree in education with an emphasis on athletic administration, McGregor served as an administrative assistant and football coach for two years at the University of Florida (1988–89). After his time at Florida, McGregor went to the University of Arkansas for four years (1989–93), elevating to the position of associate athletic director in 1992.

McGregor joined the Colorado Rockies of Major League Baseball in October 1993 as senior director of operations. He was promoted to senior vice-president in 1996 and executive vice-president in 1998. He was named president of the team in 2001.

== Death ==
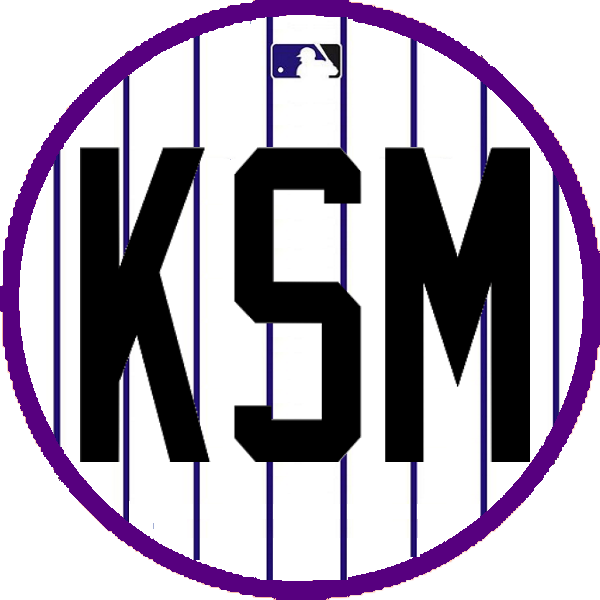
McGregor's initials were placed among the Rockies' retired numbers in 2010.

On April 20, 2010, McGregor was found dead at the age of 47 in a Salt Lake City hotel room while on a business trip. He was in his seventeenth season with the Rockies, his ninth as club president. Initial indications were that he died of natural causes. Other major figures in the game paid tribute to him as the news of his death became public. On August 30, 2010, it was announced that McGregor died of a rare virus that infected his heart muscle, causing lymphocytic myocarditis.

McGregor is one of at least 345 NFL players to be diagnosed after death with chronic traumatic encephalopathy (CTE), which is caused by repeated hits to the head.

During one of the final home games of the 2010 season, the Rockies honored McGregor by placing his initials amongst the retired numbers at Coors Field.

Eight years after his death, there was once again a McGregor presence at Coors Field, when McGregor's daughter, Taylor McGregor, became the Rockies' television reporter.
