= D'Evelyn Junior/Senior High School =

Public secondary school in Colorado, US

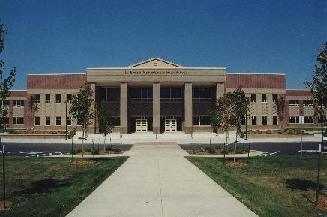

Location
- 10359 W Nassau Avenue; Denver, Colorado 80235; United States; 39°38′35″N 105°06′52″W

Information
- Type: Public secondary school
- Motto: Setting the Standard for Excellence
- Established: 1994 (32 years ago)
- School district: Jefferson County Public Schools
- CEEB code: 060671
- Principal: Josh Shapiro
- Staff: 58.08 (FTE)
- Faculty: 46
- Grades: 6-12
- Enrollment: 1,212 (2024-2025)
- Student to teacher ratio: 20.87
- Colors: Green, silver, black
- Athletics: 4A
- Mascot: Jaguar
- Website: develyn.jeffcopublicschools.org

David S. D'Evelyn Junior/Senior High School (known as D'Evelyn) is a public secondary school near Lakewood, Colorado, United States. It is included in the Jefferson County R-1 public school district. While remaining an open public school without charter or magnet status, D'Evelyn consistently ranks among the top 100 high schools in the US. D’Evelyn’s academic tenets derive from the efforts of a volunteer council to create an "alternative educational environment" in the early 1990s. D’Evelyn’s eponymous founder, David S. D’Evelyn, died in a plane crash before the council's efforts resulted in the successful enactment of the Colorado Charter Schools Act of 1993 and the nascent school secured the "option school" status required to pursue its own academic objectives with a high degree of freedom from the district.

== History ==
While the Colorado Charter Schools Act of 1993 was going through the legislative process, Dennison Elementary School, an option school in Lakewood, was straining at the limits of its site capacity providing a K-8 program. In response to the need to expand Dennison's program through high school, a group of parents proposed a combined junior and senior high school that would relocate the 7th and 8th grades from Dennison and add the high school at a rate of one grade level per year. Naming themselves the Initiating Committee, they submitted an application to the Jefferson County School Board to operate as an educational option school with a request to be considered for a charter school if the educational option request was denied on December 17, 1993.

The charter school application was denied by the school board on March 17, 1994, citing that the concept set forth in the charter application had been approved as an educational option. A memorandum of understanding was signed on April 4, 1994 to establish the school as an extension of the Dennison program with Dr. Lloyd Carlton, principal of Dennison, as the principal overseeing both programs for the 1994–1995 school year. The school was named for David D'Evelyn, who was influential in helping the Colorado Charter Schools Act of 1993 become law and died in a plane crash shortly before the act went into effect.

On August 17, 1994, the school commenced classes in the building formerly occupied by Manning Junior High School at 13200 West 32nd Avenue in Golden, Colorado with its first class of ninth graders and the seventh and eighth grade classes transferred to the school from the Dennison program. Succeeding years saw the first class advance in grade until the school served a full 7–12 program in the 1997–1998 school year.

A bond issue passed by Jefferson County voters in 1998 funded a new building for the school, which opened at the school's present location in 2001.

On September 23, 2012, the school was visited by Republican presidential candidate Mitt Romney during his campaign.

== Campus ==
The Jefferson County school district acquired 40 acres (16 ha) of the historic Fehringer Ranch property during master planning for the area in the late 1990s. Funds to build the new campus were approved in a school bond election in 1998. A formal groundbreaking ceremony took place in early 2000 and the school's grand opening was on August 25, 2001.

The campus was designed by Slater Paull & Associates. A design advisory group that included steering committee members, teachers, and parents worked with the design team to develop the school's design concept and reflect classical academic architecture. The school's design was part of the 2002 Exhibition of School Planning & Architecture judged by the Council of Educational Facility Planners.

The school is situated next to Fehringer Ranch Park on the west and the Rocky Mountain Deaf School on the east.

== Student body ==
School crest of D'Evelyn.

Forty percent of seventh grade students graduate from Dennison Elementary School, D'Evelyn's predecessor and feeder school and the other sixty percent enroll through a random lottery or from sibling priority in the lottery pool. Eighth and ninth grade admission is also through the random lottery system and the school does not permit enrollment after the beginning of ninth grade. During the 2020-2021 school year, 94 students were eligible for free and reduced-price lunches.

Enrollment per grade (2020-2021):

Grade level	Students
6	89
7	197
8	200
9	187
10	159
11	162
12	138

Demographics (2020-2021):

- 54.4% - Female
- 45.6% - Male
- 70.1% - Caucasian/White
- 13.0% - Hispanic
- 11.4% - Asian
- 4.0% - Multiracial
- 1.1% - African American
- 0.4% - American Indian/Alaska Native
- <0.1% - Native Hawaiian/Pacific Islander

== Athletics ==
D'Evelyn athletic teams primarily compete in Colorado High School Activities Association (CHSAA) competition in the 4A class, a designation for mid-sized schools. Prior to 2004, the school was in the 3A class.

As of 2023, D'Evelyn teams have won 14 state championship titles:

- Boys' Basketball: 2004 (3A)
- Cheer: 2002 (3A)
- Boys' Cross Country: 2001, 2002, 2003 (all 3A)
- Boys' Golf: 2008 (4A)
- Pom: 2002, 2003 (all 3A)
- Girls' Soccer: 2017 (4A)
- Girls' Tennis: 2017, 2021, 2022, 2023 (all 3A)
- Boys' Track: 2004 (3A)

The teams host the annual D'Evelyn Dash 5k race.

=== Marching band ===
The marching band won state championships in 2018 and 2021.

In 2021, the band was selected to perform "American Patrol" in the virtual "Parade Across America" for the inauguration of President Joe Biden. They were the only group selected to represent Colorado in the event.

=== High school band and orchestra ===
Both the high school band and the orchestra were selected by audition to perform in the statewide Colorado Music Educators' Association Clinic/Conference: the orchestra in 2013, and the band in 2014. Recorded auditions are submitted in the spring, and only two or three groups statewide are selected to perform. The Orchestra won the "Outstanding Orchestra" award in class 3A at the 2015 Colorado West Music Performance Festival, held in Grand Junction.

=== Mathematics ===
D'Evelyn students competing in mathematics were the first-place team in the state for Mathcounts in 2001 and 2002, held places on the state's American Regions Mathematics League team.

== Notable alumni ==
- Matthew Dominick '00 – member of the 2017 Astronaut Candidate Class
- Adrian Agne - Creator of Grow a Garden on Roblox
