= West Pleasant View, Colorado =

Census-designated place in Jefferson County, CO, USA

- Census-designated place
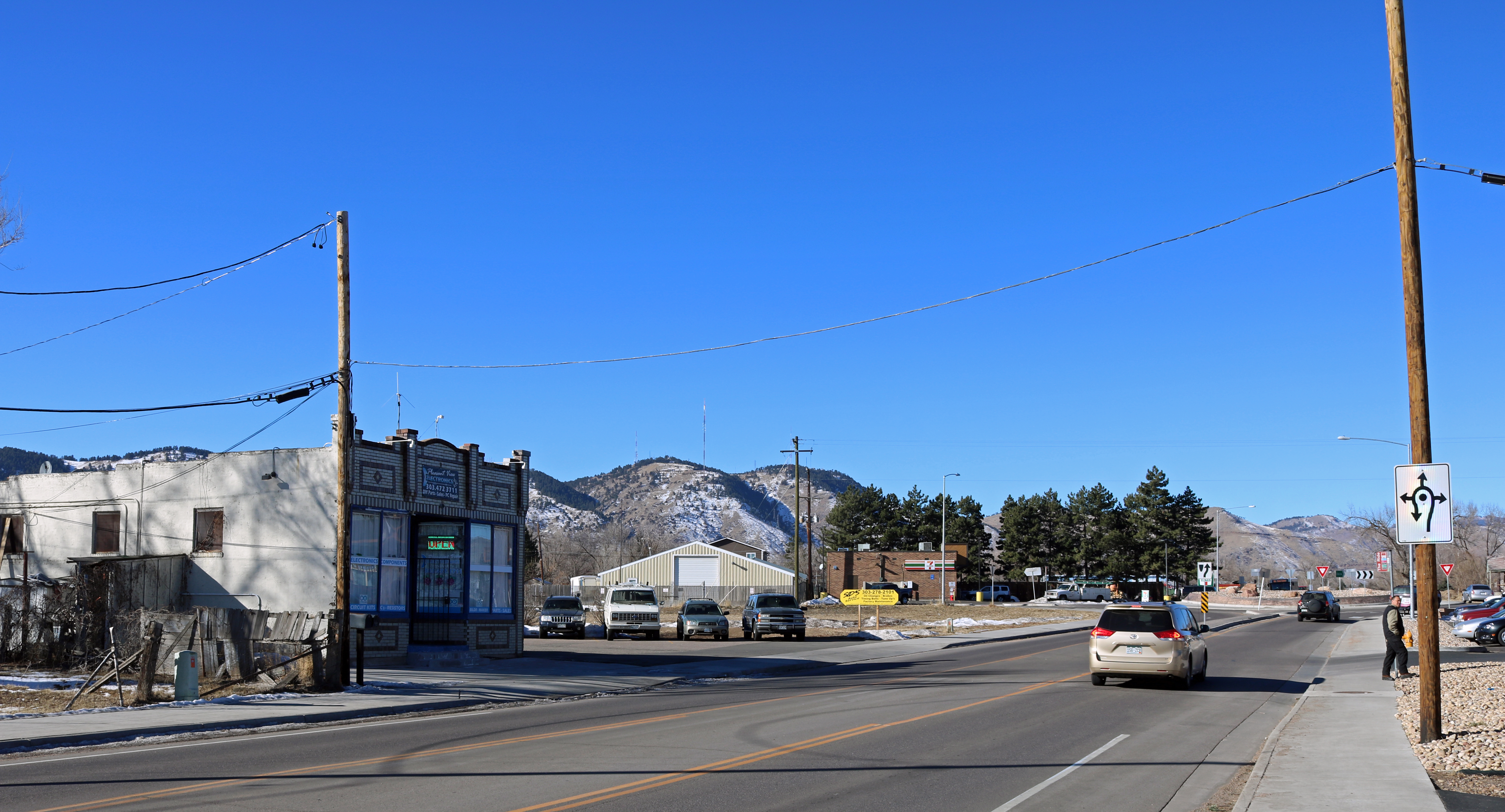
- South Golden Road in West Pleasant View.

- Location of the West Pleasant View CDP in Jefferson County, Colorado
- Coordinates: 39°43′55″N 105°10′42″W
- Country: United States
- State: Colorado
- County: Jefferson County

Government
  - Type: Unincorporated community

Area
  - Total: 1.543 sq mi (3.996 km^{2})
  - Land: 1.543 sq mi (3.996 km^{2})
  - Water: 0 sq mi (0.000 km^{2})
- Elevation: 5,824 ft (1,775 m)

Population (2020)
  - Total: 4,327
  - Density: 2,805/sq mi (1,083/km^{2})
- Time zone: UTC-7 (MST)
  - Summer (DST): UTC-6 (MDT)
- ZIP Code: Golden 80401
- Area codes: 303 & 720
- GNIS feature ID: 2409562

West Pleasant View is an unincorporated community and a census-designated place (CDP) located in and governed by Jefferson County, Colorado, United States. The CDP is a part of the Denver–Aurora–Lakewood, CO Metropolitan Statistical Area. The population of the West Pleasant View CDP was 4,327 at the United States Census 2020. The Pleasant View Metropolitan District provides services. The Golden post office (Zip code 80401) serves the area.

== History ==
West Pleasant View traces its origins in the Colorado Gold Rush, when in 1860 George Pullman and several partners assembled claims to create the Cold Spring Ranch, comprising most of its present land area. With a hewn log Stage station built by Pullman at the southeast side of the junction of today's South Golden and Mt. Vernon Roads, the ranch served many area residents and travelers at this important crossroads to and from the gold fields, served by Wells Fargo and other stagecoach companies. Making enough money on this and other ventures to realize his sleeper railcar dream, Pullman returned east in the mid-1860s, and the ranch continued as an important way station through subsequent proprietors, including three generations of Jefferson County Sheriffs.

In 1904, the Denver, Lakewood and Golden Railroad changed its name to the Denver and Intermountain Railroad and began rail mass transit to the area; soon it began to be subdivided. The Denver Rifle Club purchased five acres at its northeast end, which in time attracted the attention of the Colorado National Guard, which acquired property there and created Rifle Range in 1903, since built up to become the Camp George West Historic District. Residential development began in 1908 when the Pleasant View Development and Investment Company was created by ranch property owners D.J. Myerpeter, George C. Gilman and E.E. Sherwood. with Cecelia Prentiss building Pleasant View's first house. Fellow Pleasant View pioneer Susan Hubbard Martin, a University of Denver graduate in music, vowed "Pleasant View shall have a church of its very own" and Pleasant View Community Church was dedicated on February 8, 1931. West Colfax Avenue was built through Pleasant View in 1937 as a Works Progress Administration project, and many businesses built up along South Golden Road and Colfax that served as highways to and from the mountains. In October 1948 the Pleasant View Metropolitan District was created to serve the area's firefighting and parks needs including the Pleasant View Fire Department, and in 1951 Pleasant View Elementary School was built, spearheaded by the noted Golden educator Roger Quincy Mitchell.

Pleasant View today has a significant collection of historic landmarks spanning from throughout its unique history. Listed upon the National Register of Historic Places are the Camp George West Historic District and the Romano Residence (16300 South Golden Road), built in 1926 by CNG Quartermaster Leopold Rundstein and owned nearly a century by the Romano family of Italian heritage. Next door stands the Golden Market (16350 South Golden Road), built when Hungarian immigrant Emery John Barlock moved the Golden Cash Store from downtown Golden to here, soon acquired and long run by Samuel and Albina Romano. Rock Rest (16005 Mt. Vernon Road), its historic dance hall and wayside tavern, was built at the west side of the historic crossroads junction in 1921 by CNG Quartermaster and state Representative Bert M. Lake, who ran it with wife Daisie. It is prominently associated with noted African-American violinist, band and orchestra leader George Morrison, who played there many times from the 1920s-1950s, and had the house band of Rock Rest in at least 1926, 1928, 1945 and 1958. However he is not to be confused with the tavern's contemporaneous neighbor of the same given name, early western movie star Pete Morrison whose ranch adjoined to the northwest. Pleasant View Community Church's chapel, built in 1931, stands at 805 McIntyre Street, and Pleasant View Elementary School stands at 15920 West 10th Avenue, now home to Free Horizon Montessori School. One of the oldest remaining auto lodging courts in the area stands at 16100 South Golden Road, originally the Old Homestead, created in 1925 when Golden's first building, the Boston Company store made of hewn logs, was moved there to become a restaurant and accompanied by a service station (which tiny building still stands in front and is the area's oldest standalone gas station building) and lodging units (behind), which continued long past when the restaurant and grocery burned in 1942. Pleasant View and the surrounding area have long been noticeable for their interesting collection of native stone buildings, often built in American Craftsman types of designs, which have no common owner or architect, but are their own local architecture movement of the 1910s-1960s, which originated in 1913 with the Colorado National Guard Armory in Golden. The Pullman House, although dismantled in 1965, does still exist as logs and other components stored in the Golden area.

Historic businesses and institutions that continue to operate in Pleasant View include the Columbine Cafe at 15630 South Golden Road (built in 1933 by Greek immigrant Mike Hatzis and still owned by family), Rock Rest, Calvary Baptist Church at 17050 South Golden Road (built in 1955 as Calvary Bible Church), Eggers Lapidary at 16950 South Golden Road (established in 1972 by Verne and Vergene Eggers), Stevinson Chevrolet (established in Golden in 1935 by Ralph Ashton), Ace Liquor at 16265 South Golden Road (established in 1946), Mountain View Motel at 14825 West Colfax Avenue (built 1966), and the Sinclair Service Station at 15495 West Colfax Avenue (built 1967), the oldest remaining operational station of over 150 years of way stations and over 100 years of gas stations Pleasant View has known.

The CDP was first defined in the 2000 U.S. census. In the 1990 U.S. census, the area was statistically counted in the Applewood CDP.

== Geography ==
West Pleasant View is bordered to the west by Golden, to the east by Lakewood, and to the north by unincorporated Applewood. Interstate 70, U.S. Route 6, and U.S. Route 40 (West Colfax Avenue) all cross the community from west to east. Downtown Denver is 10 miles (16 km) to the east.

The West Pleasant View CDP has an area of 987 acres (3.996 km^{2}), all land.

== Demographics ==
The United States Census Bureau initially defined the West Pleasant View CDP for the United States Census 2000.

West Pleasant View CDP, Colorado
Year	Pop.	±%
2000	3,932	—
2010	3,840	−2.3%
2020	4,327	+12.7%
Source: United States Census Bureau

=== 2020 census ===
As of the 2020 census, West Pleasant View had a population of 4,327. The median age was 34.7 years. 15.9% of residents were under the age of 18 and 12.0% of residents were 65 years of age or older. For every 100 females there were 132.9 males, and for every 100 females age 18 and over there were 136.7 males age 18 and over.

100.0% of residents lived in urban areas, while 0.0% lived in rural areas.

There were 1,727 households in West Pleasant View, of which 21.8% had children under the age of 18 living in them. Of all households, 33.1% were married-couple households, 32.3% were households with a male householder and no spouse or partner present, and 23.6% were households with a female householder and no spouse or partner present. About 29.8% of all households were made up of individuals and 9.6% had someone living alone who was 65 years of age or older.

There were 1,814 housing units, of which 4.8% were vacant. The homeowner vacancy rate was 1.1% and the rental vacancy rate was 4.6%.

Racial composition as of the 2020 census
Race	Number	Percent
White	3,427	79.2%
Black or African American	76	1.8%
American Indian and Alaska Native	48	1.1%
Asian	116	2.7%
Native Hawaiian and Other Pacific Islander	5	0.1%
Some other race	248	5.7%
Two or more races	407	9.4%
Hispanic or Latino (of any race)	642	14.8%

== Education ==
Colorado's second largest school district, the Jefferson County Public Schools, has its headquarters in what was defined as the West Pleasant View CDP as of the 2000 Census. In the 2010 U.S. census and 2020 U.S. census, the area is not defined as being in the West Pleasant View CDP.

West Pleasant View is entirely within the Jeffco School District. Zoned schools include:

- Elementary schools: Shelton and Welchester
- Middle schools: Bell
- Golden High School

== See also ==
- Front Range Urban Corridor
