= Alameda International Junior/Senior High School =

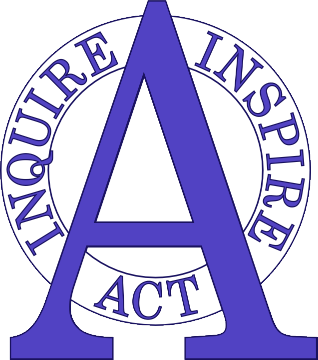

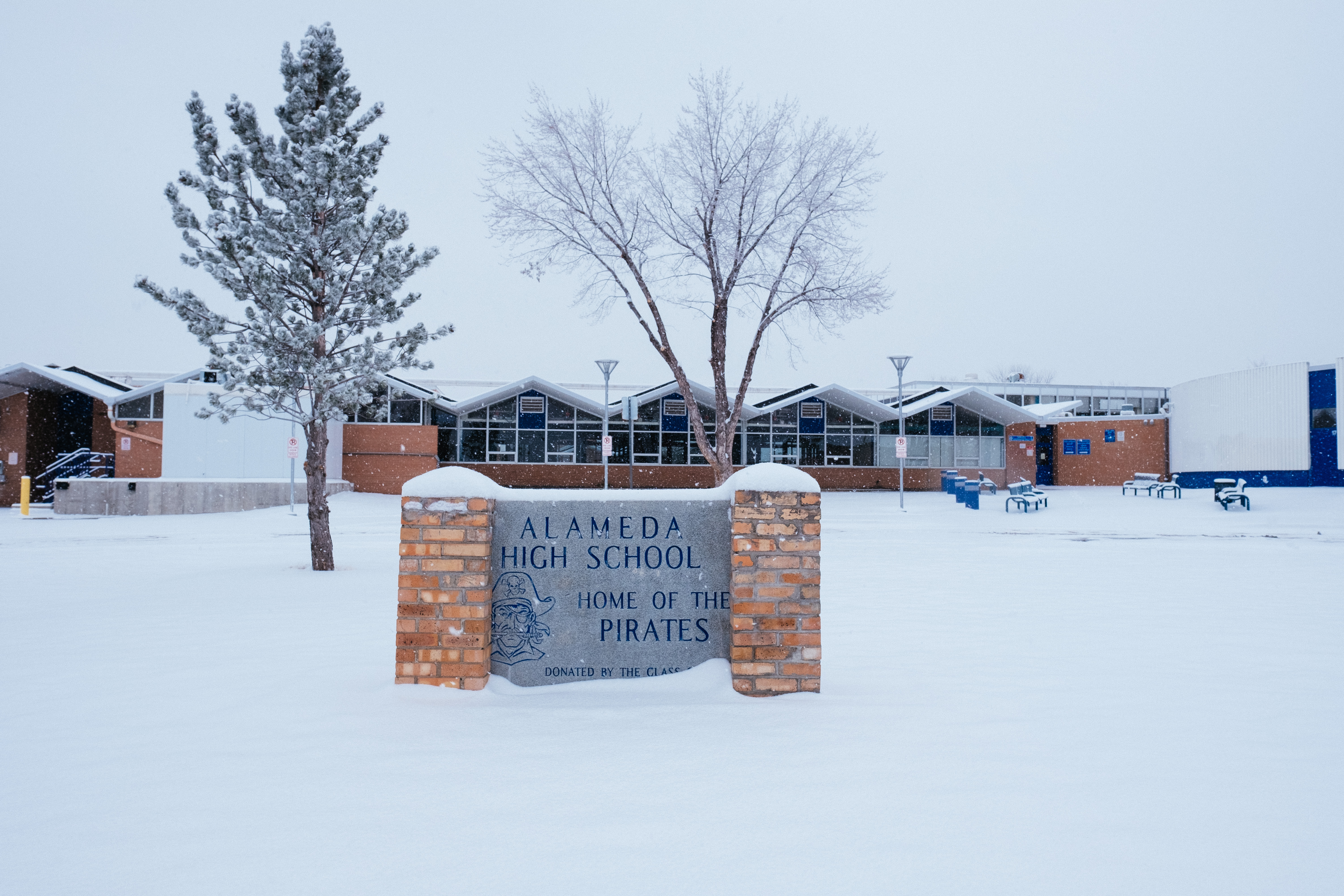
- School exterior in winter

Location
- 1255 South Wadswowrth Boulevard; Lakewood, Colorado 80232; United States
- Coordinates: 39°41′38″N 105°5′3″W

Information
- School type: Public junior-senior high school
- School district: Jefferson County R-1
- CEEB code: 060370
- NCES School ID: 080480000691
- Principal: Susie Van Scoyk
- Teaching staff: 65.22 (on an FTE basis)
- Grades: 7–12
- Enrollment: 1,027 (2023–2024)
- Student to teacher ratio: 15.75
- Colors: Blue, white, and black
- Athletics conference: CHSAA
- Mascot: Pirate
- Website: alameda.jeffcopublicschools.org

Alameda International Junior/Senior High School is located at 1255 S. Wadsworth Boulevard in Lakewood, Colorado, United States.

It is one of 158 schools in the Jefferson County Public School system, and is a combination junior high and senior high school, containing grades 7-12.

The school's colors are blue and white, and its mascot is a Pirate. The school had a rich basketball history before open enrollment. With the original basketball court and baseball field being one of the older ones in the state.

The mission statement of the school is: "Alameda International delivers a challenging, international education in which students act to create a better and more peaceful world through inquiry, intercultural understanding, and respect."

The 2015-2016 school year was the first year that Alameda functioned as a junior/senior high school. Jefferson County previously converted O'Connell Middle School into an elementary school, and moved its 7th and 8th graders to Alameda.
