= Applewood, Colorado =

Census-designated place in Jefferson County, Colorado, United States

- Census-designated place
- Location of the Applewood CDP in Jefferson County, Colorado
- Coordinates: 39°44′54″N 105°09′50″W
- Country: United States
- State: Colorado
- County: Jefferson

Government
  - Type: unincorporated community
  - Body: Jefferson County

Area
  - Total: 4.486 sq mi (11.619 km^{2})
  - Land: 4.064 sq mi (10.527 km^{2})
  - Water: 0.422 sq mi (1.092 km^{2})
- Elevation: 5,804 ft (1,769 m)

Population (2020)
  - Total: 7,833
  - Density: 1,927/sq mi (744.1/km^{2})
- Time zone: UTC−07:00 (MST)
  - Summer (DST): UTC−06:00 (MDT)
- ZIP Code: Golden 80401
- Area codes: 303/720/983
- GNIS CDP ID: 2407749
- FIPS code: 08-02575

Applewood is an unincorporated community and a census-designated place (CDP) located in Jefferson County, Colorado, United States. The CDP is a part of the Denver–Aurora–Lakewood, CO Metropolitan Statistical Area. The population of the Applewood CDP was 7,833 at the 2020 United States census. The Golden post office (Zip code 80401) serves the area.

== History ==
In the 2000 U.S. census, the size of the CDP was reduced from its size in the 1990 U.S. census. West Pleasant View CDP was formed out of parts of Applewood CDP in 2000.

== Geography ==
Applewood is 10 miles (16 km) west of downtown Denver. It is bordered to the north by Fairmount, to the northeast by Wheat Ridge, to the southeast by Lakewood, and to the southwest by West Pleasant View. South Table Mountain borders Applewood to the west.

The Applewood CDP has an area of 2,871 acres (11.619 km^{2}) including 270 acres (1.092 km^{2}) of water.

== Demographics ==
The United States Census Bureau initially defined the Applewood CDP for the 1970 United States census.

Applewood CDP, Colorado
Year	Pop.	±%
1970	8,214	—
1980	12,040	+46.6%
1990	11,069	−8.1%
2000	7,123	−35.6%
2010	7,160	+0.5%
2020	7,833	+9.4%
Source: United States Census Bureau

=== 2020 census ===
As of the 2020 census, Applewood had a population of 7,833. The median age was 42.8 years. 19.7% of residents were under the age of 18 and 20.8% of residents were 65 years of age or older. For every 100 females there were 99.0 males, and for every 100 females age 18 and over there were 98.7 males age 18 and over.

100.0% of residents lived in urban areas, while 0.0% lived in rural areas.

There were 3,178 households in Applewood, of which 27.3% had children under the age of 18 living in them. Of all households, 53.5% were married-couple households, 17.6% were households with a male householder and no spouse or partner present, and 23.2% were households with a female householder and no spouse or partner present. About 25.9% of all households were made up of individuals and 14.1% had someone living alone who was 65 years of age or older.

There were 3,305 housing units, of which 3.8% were vacant. The homeowner vacancy rate was 1.2% and the rental vacancy rate was 4.7%.

Racial composition as of the 2020 census
Race	Number	Percent
White	6,720	85.8%
Black or African American	66	0.8%
American Indian and Alaska Native	65	0.8%
Asian	147	1.9%
Native Hawaiian and Other Pacific Islander	3	0.0%
Some other race	182	2.3%
Two or more races	650	8.3%
Hispanic or Latino (of any race)	644	8.2%

== Education ==
Applewood is within the Jefferson County School District R-1.

Zoned schools for Applewood CDP (as defined in the 2020 U.S. census) include:

- Elementary schools: Maple Grove, Stober, and Welchester
- Middle schools: Everitt Middle School, and Bell Middle School
- High schools: for most areas, either Golden High School or Wheat Ridge High School (some areas are only zoned to Golden HS, and some areas are only zoned to Wheat Ridge HS)

== See also ==
- Arapahoe City, Kansas Territory
- Front Range Urban Corridor
