= Collegiate Academy of Colorado =

Charter school in Colorado, US

Location
- 8420 South Sangre de Cristo Road; Littleton, Colorado 060931; United States
- 39°34′01″N 105°06′47″W

Information
- Type: Pre-K-12 public charter school
- Established: 1994 (32 years ago)
- School district: Jefferson County, Colorado
- CEEB code: 060931
- Principal: Chris Becker
- Teaching staff: 31.89 (FTE)
- Grades: Pre-K-12
- Enrollment: 277 (2023-24)
- Student to teacher ratio: 12.70
- Campus: Suburban
- Colors: Crimson and dark green
- Mascot: Wolves
- Nickname: Wolves
- Affiliation: Jefferson County Public Schools
- Website: www.collegiateacademy.net

Collegiate Academy of Colorado is a small charter school located in the Ken Caryl area of unincorporated Jefferson County, Colorado, United States. It is a Pre-K through twelfth-grade charter school with approximately 280 students enrolled during the 2023–24 academic year. The school has a postal address of 8420 S. Sangre de Cristo Road, Littleton, 80127, and was established in 1994.

The school maintains its own athletic field, which is also rented for external community use. Additional campus facilities include a gymnasium, cafeteria, and playground. The school’s mascot is the wolf, and its official colors are crimson and dark green.

Accounts from former students have described administrative changes in recent years, including the appointment of new assistant principals. During the 2021–2022 academic year, a new assistant principal, identified as J.R., joined the administrative staff. Some former students have attributed subsequent declines in student enrollment during the 2023–24 academic year to shifts in administrative leadership and disciplinary policies.

According to one former student who attended from 2016 to 2023, disciplinary practices became more strictly enforced following these administrative changes. The student reported receiving a suspension for conduct that school officials interpreted as having malicious intent, reflecting what they described as a broader shift in disciplinary standards after 2022. Additional student accounts have raised concerns regarding the consistency of disciplinary responses to reported incidents involving physical altercations between students.
