= Standley Lake High School =

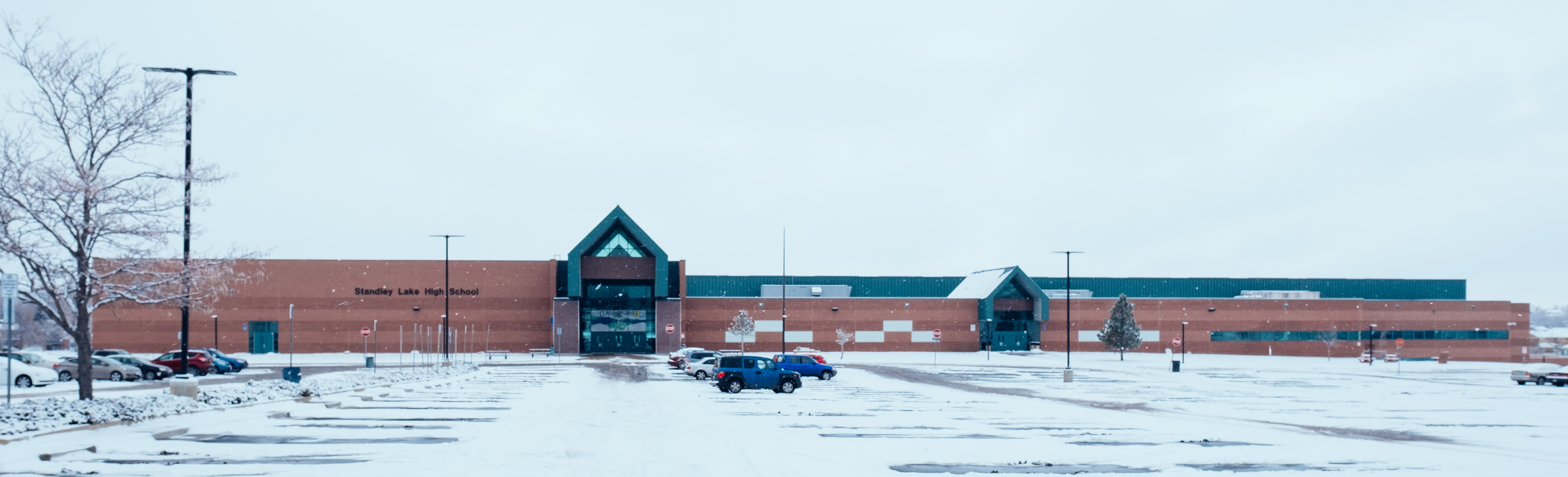

Location
- 9300 West 104th Avenue; Westminster, Colorado 80021; United States; 39°53′04″N 105°06′05″W

Information
- Type: Public secondary school
- Established: 1988 (38 years ago)
- School district: Jefferson County School District R-1
- CEEB code: 060151
- Principal: Todd Rago
- Staff: 60.51 (FTE)
- Grades: 9-12
- Student to teacher ratio: 18.79
- Colors: Blue, green, white
- Athletics: 4A
- Athletics conference: Jefferson County
- Mascot: Gators
- Newspaper: The Lake
- Website: standleylake.jeffcopublicschools.org

Standley Lake High School is a public secondary school operated by Jefferson County School District R-1 in Westminster, Colorado, United States. The school is located near 104th Avenue and Wadsworth Boulevard and is named for nearby Standley Lake. The high school opened in 1988 and a new addition to the southeast corner was opened in 2002. This school has been an I.B. (International Baccalaureate) school since 2010.

Area rivalries include Pomona High School and Ralston Valley High School in Arvada and Broomfield High School in Broomfield. The school's male athletic teams include baseball, basketball, football, cross country, soccer, golf, wrestling, hockey, track / field, and tennis. Female athletic teams include basketball, cross country, golf, gymnastics, soccer, softball, swim/dive, tennis, track, volleyball, and wrestling.

In 1991, after a student at nearby Witt Elementary won a Chex cereal contest, the Beach Boys performed a private concert for Witt students at Standley Lake High School on May 16, 1991.

In 2007, after the shootings at Virginia Tech, students at Standley Lake founded an event called Day Without Hate. They asked their classmates to wear white in order to show a commitment and trust in each other to make their school a safer place. The day was an overwhelming success. Since then, over 100,000 students across Colorado and the United States take part in Day Without Hate to show that they will not tolerate violence or hate, and they will reach out to friends and acquaintances and say, "We're all in this together."

In 2013, PeaceJam, a non-profit organization that connects students with Nobel Peace Laureates, awarded Standley Lake its annual Global Call to Action Hero Award for the school's efforts around Day Without Hate. Nobel Laureate Betty Williams visited the school to give the prize to the students.

The school is recognized for its award-winning extra-curricular programs. The FCCLA has earned the school accolades at the state and national level. The school's newsmagazine, The Lake, has won numerous state and national awards from the Colorado High School Press Association and the National Scholastic Press Association.

The school has a long running annual German exchange program where German students stay with American families for one month in May and American students stay with the German families for one month typically in June or July. This program is one of the oldest continuously functioning high school level German exchange programs in the state of Colorado. For more than twenty years the program's partner town was Deggendorf, Bavaria, however it is now Murnau, Bavaria.

On January 27, 2014, a sophomore named Vincent Nett attempted suicide by setting himself on fire in the school's cafeteria. Nett doused himself in gasoline immediately prior to the act. The event was directly witnessed by at least sixty fellow students. A faculty member was able to douse the blaze with a fire extinguisher, suffering minor injuries from breaking the glass in order to obtain it. No students were injured, and it was soon determined by police that Nett had no intentions of hurting anyone but himself. Nett suffered burns to 80% of his body in the blaze. He succumbed to his injuries just before 5pm on February 9, 2014.

== See also ==
- 2014 Jefferson County Public Schools protests
- Jefferson County, Colorado
- Jefferson County School District R-1
