= Conifer High School =

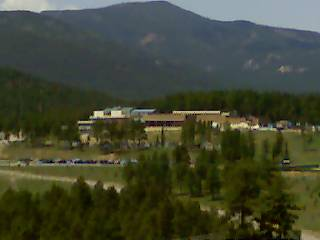
- Conifer High School, view from US-285

Location
- 10441 County Highway 73; Conifer, Colorado 80433; United States; 39°31′41″N 105°19′1″W

Information
- Type: Comprehensive public high school
- Established: August 19, 1996 (30 years ago)
- School district: Jefferson County R-1
- CEEB code: 060311
- NCES School ID: 080480001542
- Principal: Gregory Manier
- Teaching staff: 43.12 (on an FTE basis)
- Grades: 9–12
- Enrollment: 819 (2024–2025)
- Student to teacher ratio: 18.99
- Schedule type: Block
- Hours in school day: 8:30 AM – 3:45 PM
- Campus size: 105 acres (42 ha)
- Colors: Forest green and silver
- Athletics: 3A/4A
- Athletics conference: Jefferson County
- Sports: Baseball, basketball (men's and women's), cross country (men's and women's), football, golf (men's and women's), lacrosse (men's and women's), soccer (men's and women's), softball, swimming and diving (men's and women's), tennis (men's and women's), track (men's and women's), volleyball, wrestling
- Mascot: Lobo
- Team name: Lobos
- Rival: Evergreen High School (athletics)
- Yearbook: Canis Lupus
- Website: conifer.jeffcopublicschools.org

Conifer High School is a secondary school in Conifer, an unincorporated town located in the foothills of Jefferson County, southwest of Denver, Colorado, United States. The school is located about 20 minutes southwest of SH 470 and a short distance north of U.S. Highway 285.

== History ==
Conifer High School opened in the fall of 1996 to serve students in the southern portion of what had previously been Evergreen High School's matriculation area. The area encompasses a large part of southwestern Jefferson County, including the communities of Aspen Park, Buffalo Creek, Pine, and Pine Junction, as well as parts of southern Evergreen and southwestern Morrison.

The land for the school campus was acquired in a county action of eminent domain, which gives landowners the choice of either a county purchase of the land or condemning the property. One parcel was named "Rancho Lobo;" when it came time to choose a mascot, the vote decided upon the Lobos.

The opening of the school coincided with changes in the divisions of secondary, junior high, and elementary schools for the district. This meant that the first year of students consisted of eleventh grade students who had attended Evergreen High School during the previous year, and two classes of "freshmen" in ninth and tenth grade students from West Jefferson Middle School. The first year had no senior class; the first graduating class was in 1998.

In September 2014, the school gained notoriety when many teachers called in sick in response to pending actions by the Jefferson County School District. These included possible censorship of the AP US History curriculum as well as a lack of transparency in a new performance-based pay system for teachers. The following week, students and teachers at several other Jefferson County Schools joined in vocal response to the district.

== Enrollment ==
Areas in the school's attendance boundary include: Indian Hills CDP.

Enrollment by grade in the 2013–2014 academic year:

| Grade | Enrollment |
|---|---|
| 9 | 210 |
| 10 | 188 |
| 11 | 216 |
| 12 | 211 |

Enrollment by race/ethnicity in the 2013–2014 academic year:

| Race/ethnicity | Enrollment |
|---|---|
| American Indian/Alaskan | 4 |
| Asian/Pacific Islander | 12 |
| Black | 4 |
| Hispanic | 48 |
| White | 748 |

Enrollment by gender in the 2013–2014 academic year:

| Gender | Enrollment |
|---|---|
| Male | 438 |
| Female | 387 |

== Campus ==
=== Community use ===
The building houses a substation of the Jefferson County Sheriff's Department. It also once housed a campus of Red Rocks Community College. This relationship with Red Rocks allowed students to take some college courses, after normal school hours, and receive both college and high school credit. As of 2007 Red Rocks no longer operates this campus.

The building is also used for many events including health drives, holiday boutiques, and community festivals. During the wildfire season, the school has been used as a Red Cross shelter.

=== Architectural distinction ===
Designed by architectural firm LKA Partners, Conifer High School's architecture has been awarded several honors:

- Project of Distinction, Council of Educational Facilities Planners, 1996
- The James D. McConnell Award, Council of Educational Facilities Planners International, 1997
- Citation Award, American Association of School Administrators, 1998

== Extracurricular activities ==
Conifer High School is a member of the Colorado High School Activities Association (CHSAA) in District 4. It participates in activities in both the 3A classification and the 4A classification, situated between the 600 and 1400 student breakpoints for each of these classifications.

The Lobos are considered to be archrivals of the Evergreen High School Cougars, football likely being the most intense sports rivalry between the two schools. The Mountain Bowl is an annual tradition between the two towns. Conifer has won the last two of these games, the most recent with a score of 28-16.

Conifer is also the home of the Jeffo foothills all-schools competitive robotics team, Team Blitz (founded 2007), which has students from 8th through 12th grade from all neighboring schools and homeschool students, and competes and ranks well in FIRST FRC.

=== Athletics ===
Conifer High School students have the opportunity to participate in the following athletic activities under the Colorado High School Activities Association:

- Fall sports
  - Football
  - Men's soccer
  - Men's cross country
  - Women's cross country
  - Softball
  - Men's tennis
  - Volleyball
  - Men's golf
- Winter sports
  - Men's basketball
  - Women's basketball
  - Women's swimming and diving
  - Men's Wrestling
  - Women's Wrestling
- Spring sports
  - Baseball
  - Women's tennis
  - Men's lacrosse
  - Women's lacrosse
  - Women's soccer
  - Men's track
  - Women's track
  - Women's golf

==== Gymnastics ====
In 2002 Rachael Lehmkuhl was the 4A State Gymnastics All Around Champion.

==== Softball ====
2003 Conifer High School's softball team won the 4A state championship.

=== Marching band ===
The 2006 Conifer High School marching band, the Lobo Regiment, won the 3A state championship.

== Faculty and staff ==
The following individuals have been principals of Conifer High School.

| Principal | Years |
|---|---|
| Barry Schwartz | 1996–2003 |
| Cyndi Whitlock | 2003–2006 |
| Pat Termin (interim principal) | 2006–2008 |
| Mike Musick | 2009 – 2013 |
| Wesley Paxton | 2013–2022 |
| Gregory Manier | 2022–Present |

== In the news ==
In May 2007, Conifer High School had a controversy over their yearbook, which included photographs and text depicting student alcohol and drug use.

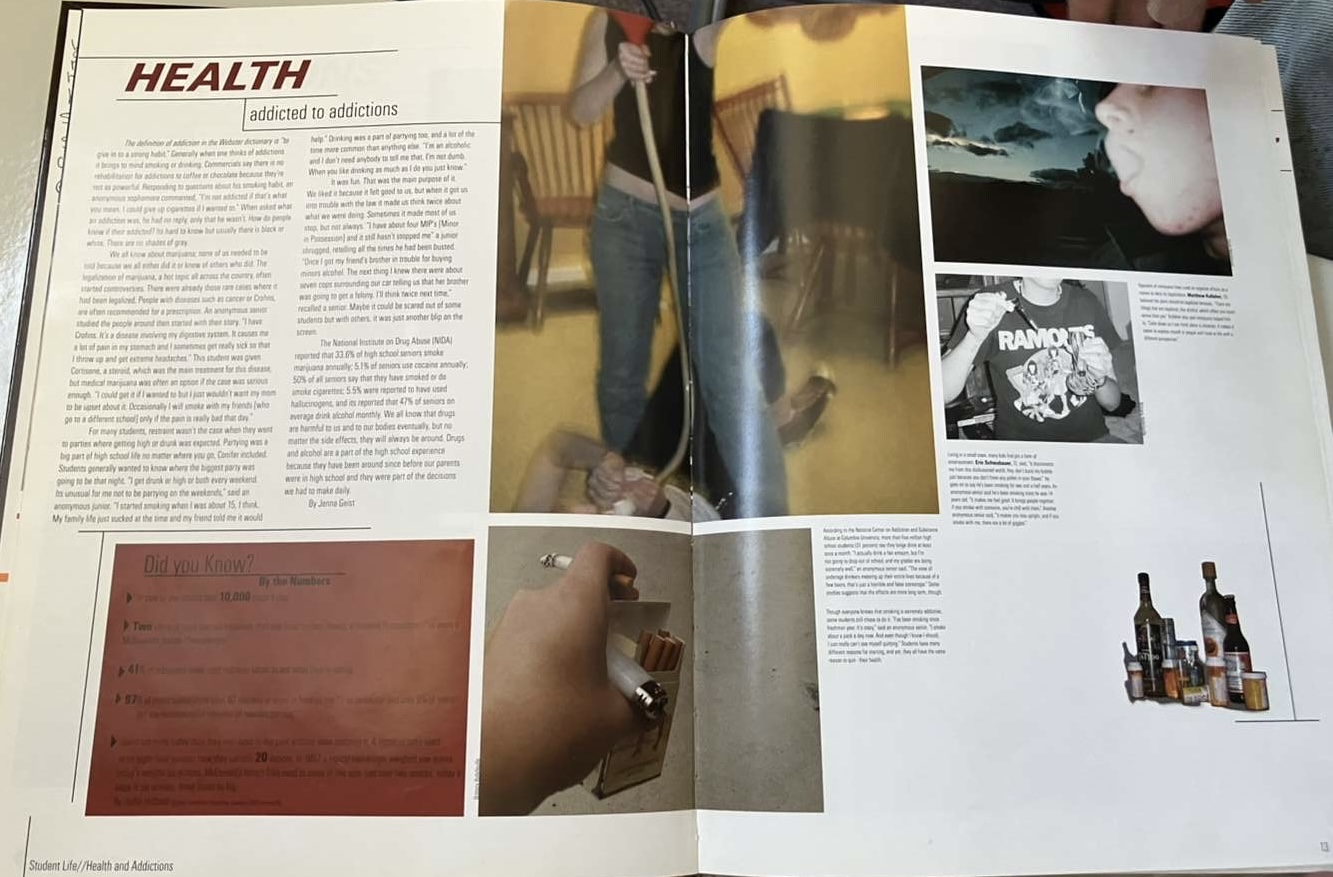
One of the controversial pages, #13.
