= FirstBank Holding Co =

American bank

FirstBank Holding Company
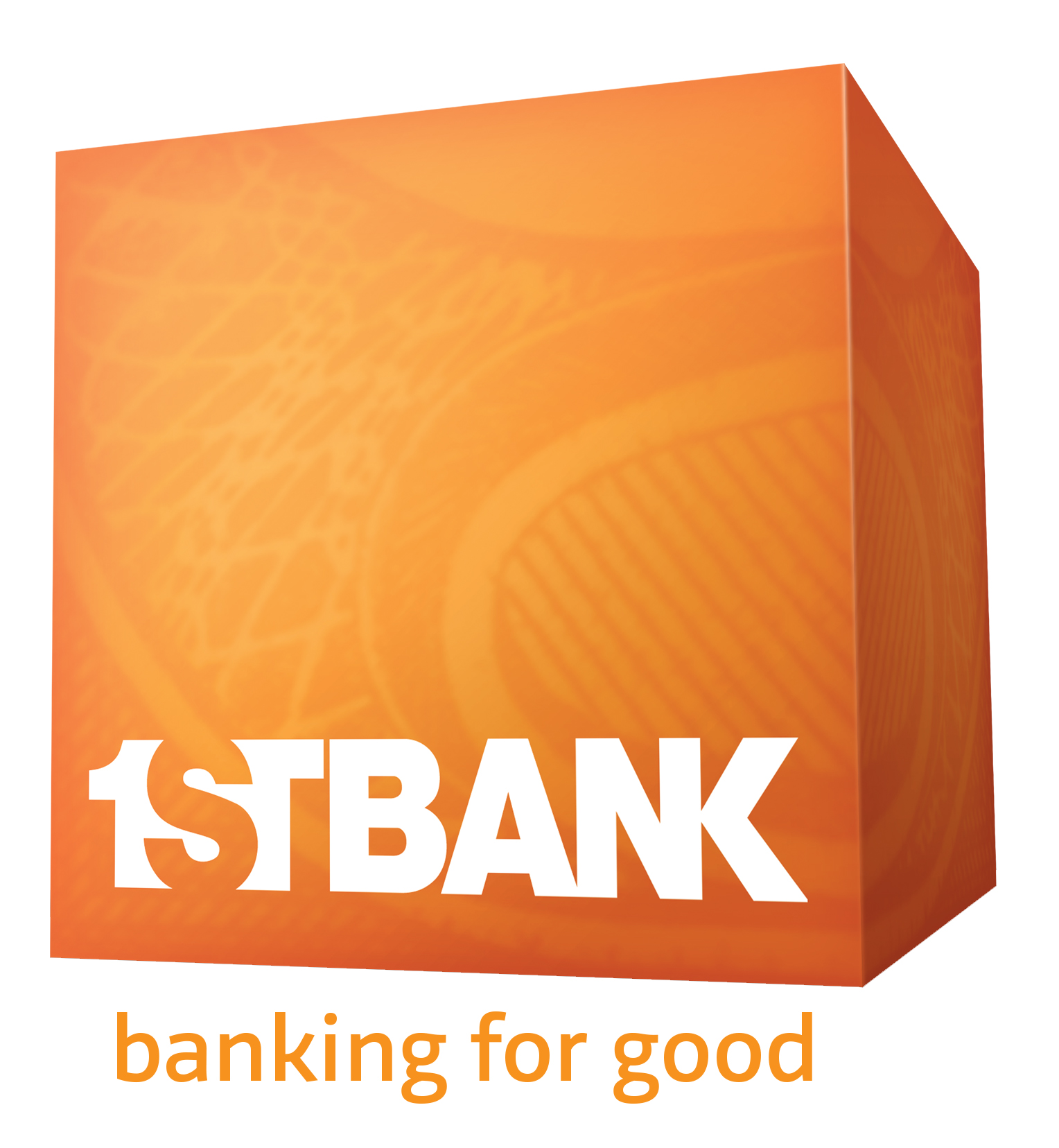
- Formerly: First Westland National Bank
- Type: Private
- Industry: Banking, financial services
- Founded: 1963; 63 years ago in Lakewood, Colorado
- Founders: Everett Williams; George Williams
- Fate: Purchased by PNC Capital in January 2026
- Headquarters: 12345 W. Colfax Avenue, Lakewood, Colorado, USA
- Area served: Predominantly in Colorado, and also in Arizona.
- Key people: Kevin Classen (CEO); Kelly Kaminskas (COO); Adam Sands (CBO)
- Products: Consumer banking, Commercial banking
- Owner: PNC Capital
- Website: efirstbank.com

FirstBank Holding Company (or 1stBank) was an American privately held bank and financial services company that operated more than 100 locations in two states in the Southwestern U.S., in Colorado and Arizona. Founded in 1963, it was headquartered in Lakewood, Colorado.

At the time its sale to PNC was announced in September 2025, FirstBank was privately held with $26.7 billion in assets. On January 5, 2026, PNC announced that it has completed the purchase of FirstBank. PNC has informed FirstBank customers that it plans to have FirstBank accounts fully transferred to PNC by the summer of 2026.

== History ==
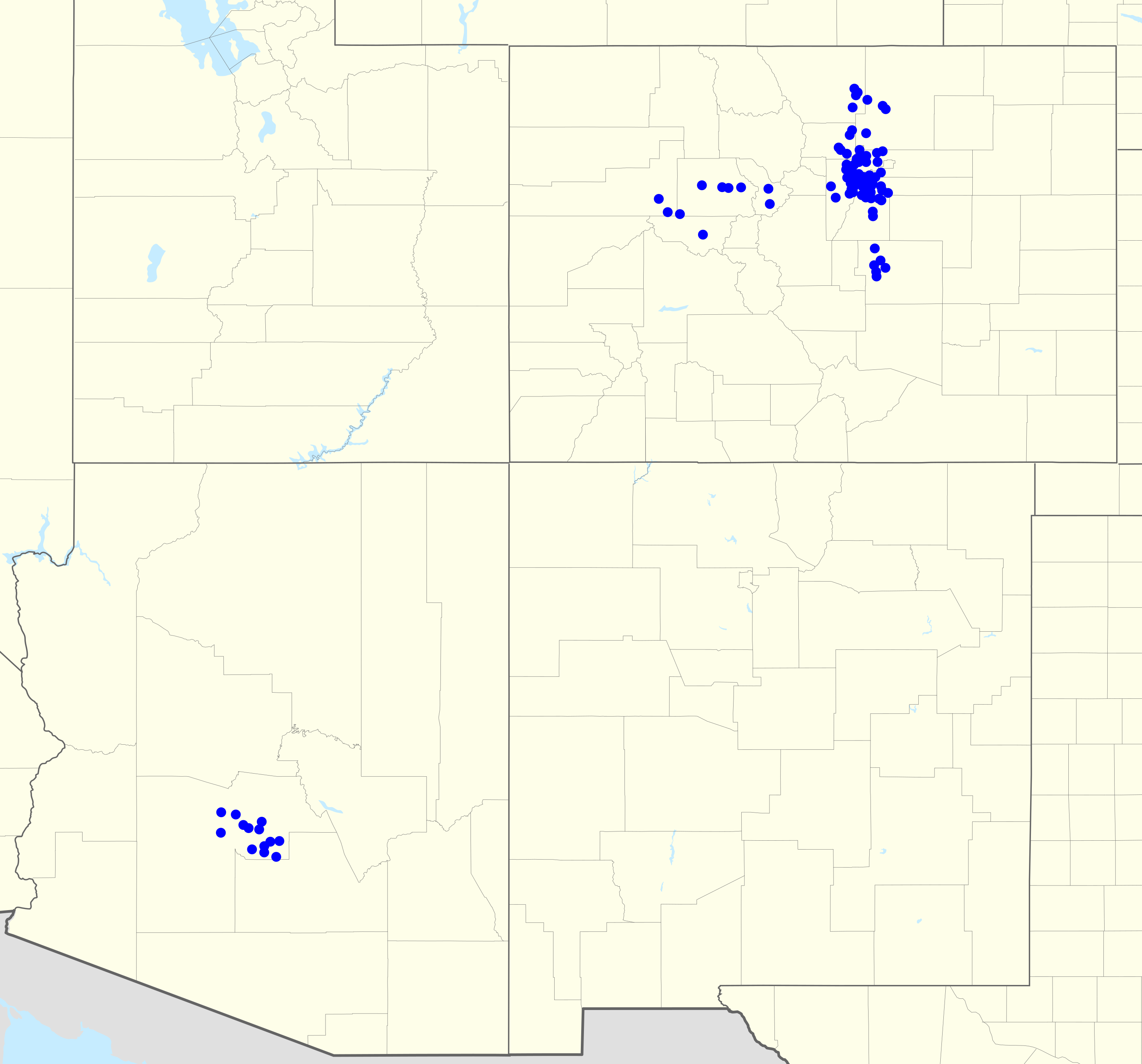
1stBank branch footprint at the time of its acquisition by PNC

FirstBank was founded by George and Everett Williams in Lakewood, Colorado, in 1963 as the First Westland National Bank. The Williams were joined on the founding board by Ira C. Rothgerber Jr. and William Johnson, both from the Denver law firm Rothgerber, Appel. Roger Reisher became the founding president of the bank and remained at the position for the first 36 years of the bank's history.

By the 1970s, the company had grown to include a number of additional Colorado locations including banks in Vail and Wheat Ridge. In 1978, the organization consolidated under its current name, FirstBank. In 1985, the bank opened its first location outside Colorado in Palm Desert, California. Through 2024, the bank operated four California branches until they were acquired by California Bank & Trust. FirstBank expanded to Arizona in 2007.

In December 2025, three months after announcing the acquisition of FirstBank for $4.1 billion, it was reported that PNC Capital had received all required regulatory approvals from federal and state banking authorities to proceed with the acquisition. The transaction was completed a month later.

== Operations ==
FirstBank had its headquarters in Lakewood, Colorado and was a member of the Federal Deposit Insurance Corporation.

In June 2016, the organization completed an addition to its facilities that expanded it to a 227,000-square-foot campus that could accommodate up to 1,400 employees.

In February 2020, FirstBank opened its Multicultural Banking Center in Lakewood to provide banking services in languages including Spanish, Chinese, Mandarin Chinese, Korean, Vietnamese and Cantonese.

== Philanthropy ==
In 2010, FirstBank partnered with Community First Foundation to launch Colorado Gives Day – a 24-hour online drive to raise funds for Colorado nonprofits. Since Colorado Gives Day's inception, more than $400 million has been raised. Gives Day expanded beyond Colorado, in 2013, with the implementation of Arizona Gives Day and Coachella Valley Giving Day in 2023. FirstBank received the 2016 Corporate Citizenship award from Governor John Hickenlooper.

== See also ==
- 1stBank Center
