= Evergreen High School (Colorado) =

Colorado High School

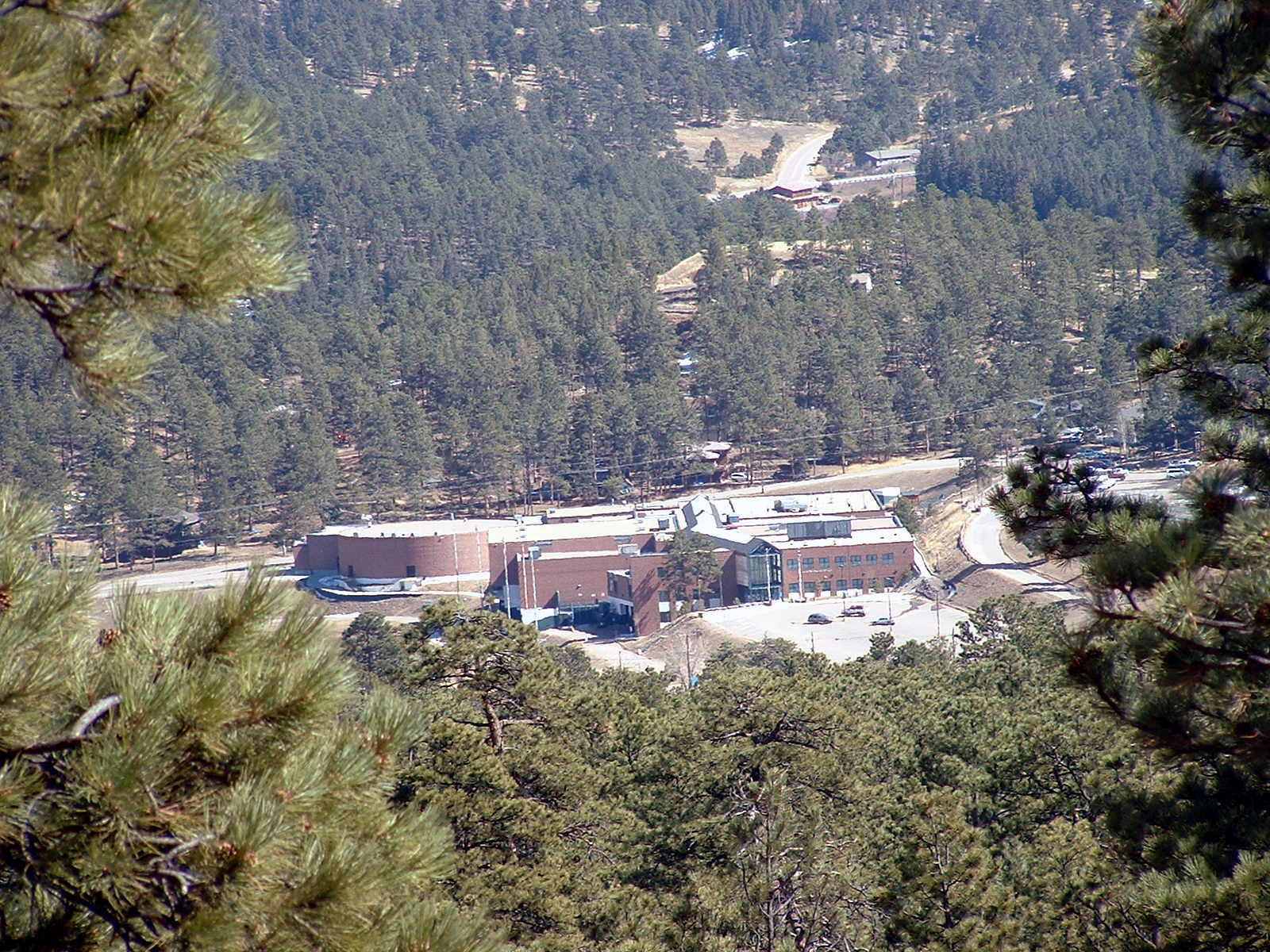
- Evergreen High School, March 2004

Location
- 29300 Buffalo Park Road; Evergreen, Colorado 80439; United States; 39°37′22″N 105°20′02″W

Information
- Type: Public high school
- Established: 1944 (82 years ago)
- School district: JEFFCO Public Schools
- CEEB code: 060560
- Principal: Skyler Artes
- Teaching staff: 44.79 (on an FTE basis)
- Grades: 9-12
- Enrollment: 909 (2024–2025)
- Student to teacher ratio: 20.29
- Colors: Navy blue and gold
- Athletics: 4A
- Athletics conference: Jefferson County
- Mascot: Cougar
- Rival: Conifer High School
- Website: evergreenhs.jeffcopublicschools.org

Evergreen High School is a public high school in the Jefferson County Public Schools district in Evergreen, Colorado, United States. Until Conifer High School opened in 1996, the school served students in both Evergreen and Conifer. Evergreen won Blue Ribbon awards for academic achievement from the United States Department of Education in 2007 and 2015.

== History ==
The first school in the Evergreen area was the Buffalo Park School, which now resides on the grounds of Wilmot Elementary School. In the late 19th century, a frame structure was built one-quarter mile south of Main Street and served as a school until 1923. Located at 4841 County Road 73, the building became Evergreen Bible Church.

Elementary and high school students were housed in the third school built in Evergreen, a red brick two-story structure located at the intersection of County Road 73 and Buffalo Park Road. It was built in 1922 when District 30 became C2, the second consolidation in Jefferson County. An adjacent white masonry building was built in 1944 for the high school, and the first class graduated from the newly christened high school in 1948.

The school quickly outgrew its building, and a new building was erected southwest of the bus barn at the intersection of Olive Road and Buffalo Park Road, opening in 1954. The building grew through additions, creating a somewhat haphazard layout until the structure was unified with a "main street" layout as part of an addition and remodel in the late 1990s, designed by H+L Architecture.

Following the Columbine High School massacre in 1999, located only thirty minutes away from Evergreen, Jefferson County Schools hired Jackson Katz, co-founder of the Mentors In Violence Prevention program, to adapt the collegiate program for high schools. Evergreen High School was chosen as the pilot school for the project. In the program, students volunteered as mentors for younger students.

== Shooting ==
On September 10, 2025, 16-year-old Desmond Holly, a student at the school, arrived on school premises with a revolver and opened fire inside and outside the school. Holly shot and wounded two students; no one was killed. Holly was then blocked by multiple security doors, where he committed suicide. Authorities investigating the incident said Holly had been radicalized by digital extremist spaces and expressed neo-Nazi views online. They also said Holly had a fascination and possible obsession with Natalie Rupnow, the perpetrator of the Abundant Life Christian School shooting. Prior to the attack, Holly had posted a video of himself posing like Rupnow, and videos of him creating a shirt like one of the Columbine shooters wore on TikTok. Only one of the two victims were identified publicly. Colorado senator Michael Bennet publicly stated that he was "horrified" by the shooting and thanked law enforcement officers for their "swift response." Media coverage of the shooting was vastly overshadowed by the assassination of right-wing activist Charlie Kirk, which happened just four minutes earlier the same day.

== Students ==
=== Demographics ===
Evergreen High School student demographics in the 2024–2025 school year:

- American Indian/Alaskan Native: 0.1%
- Asian: 0.7%
- Black: 1.1%
- Hispanic: 8.8%
- White: 86.5%
- Multiracial: 2.9%

== Extracurricular activities ==
=== Athletics ===
The Cougars are rivals of the Conifer High School Lobos, football being the most intense sports rivalry between the two schools. The Mountain Bowl is an annual tradition between the two towns.

State championships:

- Boys' cross country: 1965 (III)
- Boys' golf: Chuck Canepa, 1968; Brett Dean, 1984 & 1986
- Gymnastics: 2008 (4A), 2011 (4A)
- Poms: 1996 (4A), 1998 (4A), 2001 (4A), 2002 (4A), 2003 (4A), 2005 (4A)
- Boys' soccer: 1989 (unclassed), 2015 (4A)
- Girls' soccer: 1990 (unclassed), 1997 (4A), 2024 (4A)
- Girls' swimming: 2013 (4A), 2014 (4A), 2015 (4A), 2018 (3A), 2019 (3A)
- Boys' track and field: 1968 (AA)
- Volleyball: 1976 (AAA), 1978 (AAA), 1979 (AAA), 1980 (AAA), 1981 (AAA), 1982 (AAA), 1983 (4A), 1984 (4A), 1985 (4A)
- Girls' basketball: 2017 (4A), 2018 (4A)
- Girls' lacrosse: 2024 (4A)

=== Mock trial ===
Evergreen High School's mock trial team won state championships in 1988, 1989, 1990, 1992, and 2007. The team won the National High School Mock Trial Championship in 1990 and returned to the national competition in May 2007, placing 10th.

== Notable alumni ==
- Jeff Ashby (1972) – Space Shuttle astronaut
- Brandon Barnes (1997) – drummer for Rise Against
- Shane Bertsch (1988) – PGA Tour member
- Brock Burke (2014) – Major League Baseball pitcher
- Ronnie Cramer (1975) – film director
- Griffin Dorsey (2017) – Major League Soccer player
- Kevin Kouzmanoff (1999) – Major League Baseball player
- Trey Parker (1988) – South Park co-creator
- Pat Porter (1977) – Olympic 10,000-meter runner
- Jamin Winans (1995) – filmmaker
