= Jefferson County Public Schools (Colorado) =

School district in Jefferson County, Colorado

Jeffco Public Schools

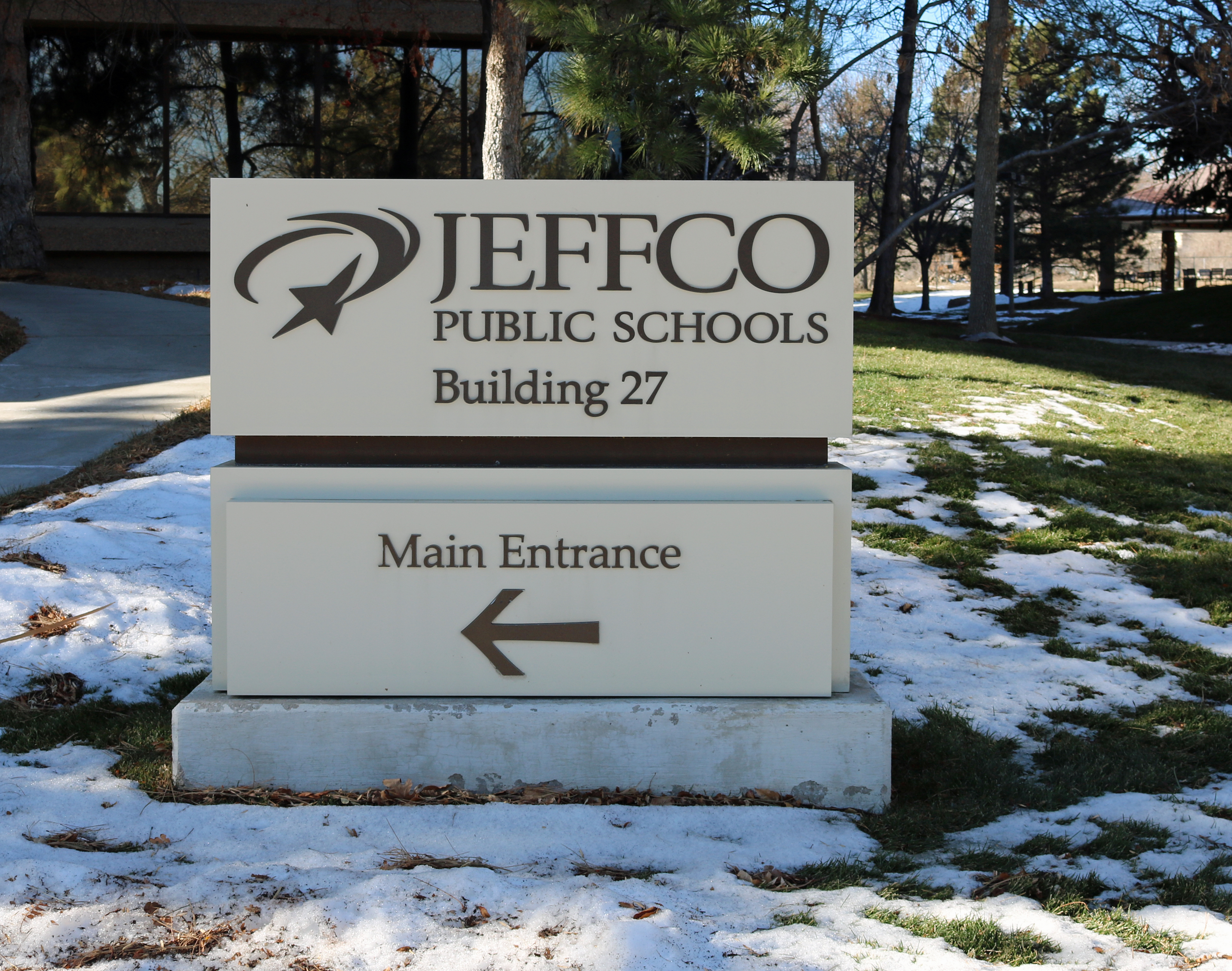
- The sign at district headquarters

Location
- West Pleasant View (2000 US Census), Colorado; United States
- Coordinates: 39°44′20″N 105°09′53″W

District information
- Grades: Pre-K to 12th Grade
- Established: 1950 (76 years ago)
- Superintendent: Tracy Dorland
- School board: School Board Info (web site)
- NCES District ID: 0804800

Students and staff
- Enrollment: 75,495 (January 2025)
- Staff: 4,448.94 (on an FTE basis)
- Student–teacher ratio: 16.69

Other information
- Website: jeffcopublicschools.org

Jefferson County School District R-1 (a.k.a. Jefferson County Public Schools or Jeffco Public Schools) is a school district in Jefferson County, Colorado, United States. The district is headquartered at the Jeffco Public Schools Education Center in an unincorporated area of the county near Golden in the Denver metropolitan area. Jeffco Public Schools serves almost 81,000 students in 160 schools. It is the second-largest school district in Colorado, having been surpassed in 2013 by Denver Public Schools, which has an enrollment of approximately 81,000. The district covers the entirety of Jefferson County, and also includes a section of the adjacent city of Broomfield.

== History ==
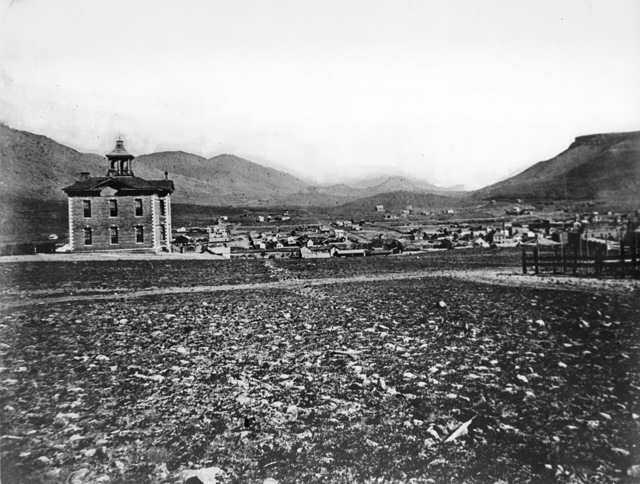
The South School, Golden, Colorado, when it originally served all of Golden School District #1. Photo taken around 1874.

=== Beginnings ===
The first school in Jefferson County and the second school in Colorado opened in Golden on January 9, 1860. It stood at around today's 1304 Washington Avenue and was a rented log cabin, with school taught by Thomas Daughterty, with 18 students, financed through tuition and subscription. Its second term was taught by Miss M. F. Manly. When Jefferson County was organized by the Territorial government in 1861, the capability of organizing public schools became reality, and George West became the first superintendent of Jefferson County schools. After a mill levy was created in 1862, the first two school districts, Golden and Vasquez (roughly today's Wheat Ridge/Arvada area), were organized in 1863. That September the first public school in the county opened in Golden.

=== Original school districts ===
Over time, as the population grew and spread across the county, more and more school districts were organized, each with its own elected board to govern them. They were a diverse variety of schools, from the stately brick edifices of urban Golden which operated through the traditional school year, to the rural one-room wooden schoolhouses that operated during the summer months because winter in the mountains made it difficult for students to attend. Some school districts only rented buildings for class; others shared into neighboring counties. The first building constructed as a Jefferson County public school, around the area of 14th and Arapahoe Streets in Golden, was never completed and eventually sold in 1866 to Colorado Territorial Governor Alexander Cummings for $2,700 for use as the Territorial Executive Building. Its replacement, the first completed public school building in Jefferson County, still stands today at 1420 Washington Avenue in Golden. After the completion of its successor at today's 1314 Cheyenne Street in 1873, later known as the South School, Jefferson County's first senior high school, Golden High School, was organized. The first public school graduations in Jefferson County were held in the 1880s.

By 1894, Jefferson County school enrollment was around 1,500 students, with 54 high school students. By 1939 Jeffco had blossomed to 3,883 students with 1,426 high schoolers. In the early 20th century, however, population shifts and other factors began to spur consolidation. The Lorraine School District of Jefferson County merged with the Mandalay School District of Boulder County (Broomfield) in 1917. In 1920 the Montana, Lakeview, Midway and Mt. Carbon districts merged to become Bear Creek District C-1. In 1923 several mountain districts merged into Evergreen District C-2, while in 1945 Washington Heights and Bancroft merged to form School District 52. However, some school districts went by the wayside including South Platte in 1944, Pleasant Park in 1946, and Pine Grove. By 1950 only 39 of the 54 individually organized school districts remained.

==== List of historic school districts ====
Note: several districts have different identities over time.

1. Golden
2. Everett/Vasquez/Arvada
3. Mt. Vernon/Kittredge
4. Bergen/Creswell
5. Bear Creek/Mt. Carbon
6. Ralston/Fremont
7. Upper Ralston/Leyden
8. Vasquez/Wheat Ridge
9. Mt. Vernon/Bradford Junction/Conifer
10. Guy Hill
11. Platte/Spruce Park & Sprucedale
12. Ralston
13. Mountain/Rockland
14. Clear Creek/Maple Grove
15. Platte Canyon/Deer Creek
16. Bear Creek/Montana
17. Turkey Creek/Brownville/Medlen
18. Pine & Estabrook
19. Pleasant Park
20. Fairmount
21. Lakewood/Edgewater
22. Mt. Morrison
23. Lothrop
24. South Platte
25. Lorraine & Mandalay
26. Turkey Creek/Hodgson
27. Coal Creek Canyon/Columbine
28. Pine Grove
29. Belcher Hill
30. Buffalo Creek/Evergreen
31. Soda Creek
32. Fruitdale
33. Jefferson City/Plainview
34. Kassler
35. Urmston
36. Lamb
37. Lakeview
38. Parmelee Gulch
39. Semper
40. Buffalo Creek
41. Bancroft
42. Idledale
43. Wagner
44. Prospect Valley
45. Midway
46. Sampson
47. Lakewood - Stober Elementary
48. Daniels
49. Denver View
50. Washington Heights
51. Mountair
52. Washington Heights & Bancroft
- C-1 - Bear Creek Consolidated
- C-2 - Evergreen Consolidated

In 1950, the 39 school districts in Jefferson County were consolidated and reorganized into a single district, Jefferson County R-1 Schools. It was so named as the Reorganized School District 1, and ushered in a modern age in a county where some still sent to school in the original one-room rural schoolhouses. Through the course of time several landmark school buildings had been built across Jefferson County, including Golden's North, South, Central and High schools; the stone Morrison school; and Lakewood's 3-school campus. With renewed energy a new generation would be built, and state-of-the-art schools sprouted across Jefferson County as old schools were phased out. By 1999 Jefferson County had an enrollment of 88,793 students.

Today the next wave of school buildings is being created, as Jefferson County schools move forward into the 21st century. However, a good collection of schools from throughout Jeffco's educational history remain. They serve many uses from private homes to museums, and several are designated Jefferson County, Colorado and National Historic Register landmarks.

Through Jeffco schools' history, there have been several fatal events which have not been forgotten. In 1887 the original Lamb School, which had just been built the year before, burned down and had to be replaced. (The rebuilt school was later destroyed by the Lower North Fork Fire in 2012.) In 1905 Golden's South School, including Golden High School, was saved from explosion by janitor Oscar Nolin when its overheating boiler was minutes away from claiming possibly over 100 lives. In 1916 the original Fruitdale School burned as its students marched to safety. In 1919 an attempt to burn down the South School was made by a parent who was frantic to keep the school from reopening in the wake of the Great Flu Epidemic, but the fire smothered itself out. In 1938 the recently built Buffalo Creek School burned while school was in session from an overheated furnace, and teacher Wilma Barnes successfully got all 15 students to safety. On April 7, 1982, Scott Darwin Michael was shot and killed by classmate Jason Rocha at Deer Creek Middle School. In 1999, two students killed 12 students and a teacher in the Columbine High School massacre.

On February 23, 2010, eighth-graders Reagan Webber and Matt Thieu were shot and wounded at Deer Creek Middle School. The incident ended when math teacher David Benke tackled the perpetrator, Bruco Strong Eagle Eastwood, who was armed with a .30-06 Winchester Model 70.

In September 2014, students and teachers in schools around the district protested the conservative ideology of the school board, which had proposed reviewing the APUSH curriculum set by the College Board, to focus history education on citizenship and patriotism, while condemning civil disobedience and strike actions. The conservative members of the board were recalled and replaced in November 2015, on a 64-36 public vote.

== Environmental consideration ==
Many Jefferson County schools make use of constructed wetlands for managing stormwater and contributing to the health of local watersheds. The wetland project at Oberon Middle School has been lauded by the National Resources Defense Council for setting "an example for local governments seeking new ways to manage stormwater on municipal grounds with some value added.

== Literary mentions ==
Oberon Middle School is the setting for the novel Define "Normal" by Julie Anne Peters.

== Facilities ==
The school district headquarters, which has a Golden postal address, is in an unincorporated area completely surrounded by, but not in, Lakewood.

In the 1990 U.S. census, the facility was defined as being in the Applewood census-designated place. In the 2000 U.S. census, the facility was in West Pleasant View, another CDP in the county. In the 2010 U.S. census and the 2020 U.S. census, the Jeffco headquarters plot was not defined as being in any CDP.

== Schools ==
As of January 2025, there are 160 active schools in Jeffco Public Schools, as identified by the Colorado Department of Education.

=== Elementary schools ===
- Adams Elementary School
- Bear Creek K-8 School
- Belmar School of Integrated Arts
- Bergen Elementary School
- Blue Heron Elementary School
- Bradford K-8 School
- Columbine Hills Elementary School
- Coronado Elementary School
- Deane Elementary School
- Dennison Elementary School
- Devinny Elementary School
- Dutch Creek Elementary School
- Edgewater Elementary School
- Eiber Elementary School
- Elk Creek Elementary School
- Fairmount Elementary School
- Fletcher Miller School
- Foothills Elementary School
- Foster Dual Language PK-8 School
- Free Horizon Montessori School
- Fremont Elementary School
- Governor's Ranch Elementary School
- Green Gables Elementary School
- Hackberry Hill Elementary School
- Hutchinson Elementary School
- Kendallvue Elementary School
- Kendrick Lakes Elementary School
- Kyffin Elementary School
- Lasley Elementary School
- Lawrence Elementary School
- Leawood Elementary School
- Little Elementary School
- Lukas Elementary School
- Lumberg Elementary School
- Maple Grove Elementary School
- Marshdale Elementary School
- Meiklejohn Elementary School
- Mitchell Elementary School
- Mortensen Elementary School
- Mount Carbon Elementary School
- Normandy Elementary School
- Parmalee Elementary School
- Patterson International School
- Peak Expeditionary School at Pennington
- Powderhorn Elementary School
- Prospect Valley Elementary School
- Ralston Elementary School
- Red Rocks Elementary School
- Rooney Ranch Elementary School
- Rose Stein International Elementary School
- Ryan Elementary School
- Secrest Elementary School
- Semper Elementary School
- Shaffer Elementary School
- Shelton Elementary School
- Sierra Elementary School
- Slater Elementary School
- Sobesky Academy
- South Lakewood Elementary School
- Stevens Elementary School
- Stober Elementary School
- Stony Creek Elementary School
- Stott Elementary School
- Swanson Elementary School
- Three Creeks K-8 School
- Ute Meadows Elementary School
- Van Arsdale Elementary School
- Vanderhoof Elementary School
- Warder Elementary School
- Weber Elementary School
- Welchester Elementary School
- West Jefferson Elementary School
- West Woods Elementary School
- Westgate Elementary School
- Westridge Elementary School
- Wilmot Elementary School

=== Middle/Junior high schools ===
- Bear Creek K-8 School
- Bell Middle School
- Carmody Middle School
- Creighton Middle School
- Deer Creek Middle School
- Drake Middle School
- Dunstan Middle School
- Evergreen Middle School
- Everitt Middle School
- Falcon Bluffs Middle School
- Ken Caryl Middle School
- Mandalay Middle School
- North Arvada Middle School
- Oberon Middle School
- Pomona Junior/Senior High School
- Summit Ridge Middle School
- Wayne Carle Middle School
- West Jefferson Middle School

=== Senior high schools ===
School	City	Year opened
Alameda International Junior/Senior High School	Lakewood	1960
Arvada High School	Arvada	1900
Arvada West High School	Arvada	1960
Bear Creek High School	Lakewood	1920
Chatfield High School	Littleton	1985
Columbine High School	Littleton	1973
Conifer High School	Conifer	1996
Dakota Ridge High School	Littleton	1996
Evergreen High School	Evergreen	1954
Golden High School	Golden	1873
Green Mountain High School	Lakewood	1973
Jefferson High School	Edgewater	1955
Lakewood High School	Lakewood	1928
Pomona Junior/Senior High School	Arvada	1973
Ralston Valley High School	Arvada	2000
Standley Lake High School	Westminster	1988
Wheat Ridge High School	Wheat Ridge	1886

=== Option schools ===
- Brady Exploration High School
- D'Evelyn Junior/Senior High School
- Dennison Elementary School
- Jeffco Virtual Academy
- Jefferson County Open School
- Long View High School
- The Manning School
- McLain Community High School
- Warren Tech

=== Special schools and programs ===
- Connections Learning Center
- Fletcher Miller School
- Mt. Evans Outdoor Education Laboratory School
- Mount View Youth Services Center
- Sobesky Academy
- Windy Peak Outdoor Education Laboratory School

=== Charter schools ===
- Addenbrooke Classical Academy
- Addenbrooke Classical Grammar School
- Collegiate Academy
- Compass Montessori Golden
- Compass Montessori Wheat Ridge
- Doral Academy of Colorado
- Excel Academy Charter School
- Free Horizon Montessori School
- Jefferson Academy
- Lincoln Academy
- Montessori Peaks Charter Academy
- Mountain Phoenix Community School
- New America School
- Rocky Mountain Academy of Evergreen
- Rocky Mountain Deaf School
- The Summit Academy
- Two Roads Charter School
- Woodrow Wilson Academy

== Former schools ==
School	City	Year opened	Year closed	Additional information
Alameda Junior High School	Lakewood		1987	current Gold Crown Foundation Fieldhouse
Allendale Elementary School	Arvada	1964	2021	
Arvada K-8 School	Arvada	2010	2024	building was Arvada High School (1953 - 1971), then Arvada Junior High (1971 - ), K-8 restructure followed 2010 closure of Russell Elementary
Belmont Junior High School	Lakewood	1955	1979	
Bergen Meadow Elementary School	Evergreen	1970	2024	consolidated into Bergen Elementary School
Campbell Elementary School	Arvada	1964	2023	converted to preschool
Center for Discovery Learning Charter School	Lakewood	1994	2005	founded as Community-Involved Charter School, 1994
Colorow Elementary School	Littleton	1977	2023	
Columbia Heights Elementary School	Wheat Ridge	1925	1978	current Wheat Ridge Library and Senior Resource Center
Daniels Elementary	Lakewood		1978	
Edgewater High School	Edgewater		1955	merged into Jefferson High School
Emory Elementary School	Lakewood	2015	2023	previously O'Connell Middle School; Rose Stein Elementary School students during building renovation (2015-2018)
Fitzmorris Elementary School	Arvada	1960	2022	
Fruitdale School	Wheat Ridge	1927	1978	current Fruitdale School Lofts
Glennon Heights Elementary School	Lakewood	1957	2023	
Golden Junior High School	Golden	1956	1988	was Golden High School (1924 - 1956); current American Mountaineering Center
Green Mountain Elementary School	Lakewood	1962	2023	
Earle Johnson Elementary School	Golden	1960	1994	current Connections Learning Center
East Arvada Junior High School	Arvada		1984	demolished 1986
Irwin Elementary School	Lakewood		1989	
Juchem Elementary School	Broomfield	1955	1989	current Jefferson Academy elementary campus
Kullerstrand Elementary School	Wheat Ridge	1961	2023	
Lakewood Junior High School	Lakewood		c. 1970s	current Jeffco Open School
Martensen Elementary School	Wheat Ridge	1954	2011	current Frank DeAngelis Community Safety Center
Molholm Elementary School	Lakewood	1955	2023	
Moore Middle School	Westminster	1980	2024	merged into Pomona High School
Mountain Open High School	Evergreen	1975	1989	merged into Jefferson County Open School; site now occupied by Evergreen Library
Mountair High School	Lakewood		1955	merged into Jefferson High School
North Lakewood Elementary School	Lakewood	1947	1978	property sold by district
O'Connell Middle School	Lakewood		2015	merged into Alameda International Junior/Senior High School, subsequently Emory Elementary (2015-2023)
Open Living School	Edgewater	1971	1978	merged into Tanglewood School
Open Living School	Evergreen	1971	1978	merged into Tanglewood School
Parr Elementary School	Arvada	1969	2023	
Peck Elementary School	Arvada	1966	2023	
Peiffer Elementary School	Littleton	1973	2023	
Pleasant View Elementary School	Golden	1950	2017	
Russell Elementary School	Arvada	1955	2010	current Arvada Head Start campus
Sheridan Green Elementary School	Westminster	1988	2023	property reverted to city ownership
Sun Valley Elementary School	Lakewood	1971	1979	property sold by district
Tanglewood School	Golden	1970	1989	merged into Jefferson County Open School
Thomson Elementary School	Arvada	1973	2023	
Vivian Elementary School	Lakewood	1954	2023	
Washington Heights School	Lakewood	1898	1968	current Washington Heights Arts Center, city of Lakewood
West Lakewood Elementary School	Lakewood	1958	1978	current Dennison Elementary School
Wheat Ridge 5-8 School	Wheat Ridge	1924	2015	merged into Jefferson Junior/Senior High School; current Stevens Elementary School
Wilmore-Davis Elementary School	Wheat Ridge	1955	2023	
Witt Elementary School	Westminster	1980	2023	
Zerger Elementary School	Westminster	1977	2011	

== Demographics ==
As of January 2025, with an enrollment count of 75,495 for the 2024-2025 school year:

- American Indian 0.4%
- Asian 2.7%
- Black 1.2%
- Hispanic 26%
- White 64%
- Native Hawaiian / Pacific Islander 0.13%
- Multiple races 5%

== Superintendents ==
The position of Superintendent of Schools was an elected position from 1861 to 1967, following the abolition of the position as an elected position by voters in 1966. Since 1967, the district superintendent has been appointed by the school board.

- 1862 George West
- 1862 Edward L. Berthoud
- 1863–1865 Ephraim Fellows
- 1865–1867 Jonas M. Johnson
- 1867–1868 Thomas T. Potter
- 1868–1875 Marcellus C. Kirby
- 1875–1879 Rev. Robert L. Stewart
- 1979–1884 Thomas Lloyd Bellam
- 1884–1888 William G. Smith
- 1888–1894 James S. Eagleton
- 1894–1898 John W. Arasmith
- 1898–1902 Clyde O. Secrest
- 1902–1905 Ida L. Crawford
- 1905–1909 Myrtle Songer
- 1909–1913 Elizabeth Hemberger
- 1913–1919 Berness Bunger
- 1919–1923 Myrtle Songer
- 1923–1925 Evangaline B. Cummings
- 1925–1929 Birdie Easley Shannon
- 1929–1933 Miriam Brown Martensen
- 1933–1941 Naomi Kullerstrand Olson
- 1941–1945 Marguerite R. Juchem
- 1945–1949 Sara H. Morris
- 1949–1959 Miriam Brown Martensen
- 1959–1963 Pauline F. Schroeder
- 1963–1965 George E. Hook
- 1965–1967 Louise "Peg" Johnstone
- 1967–1971 W. Del Walker
- 1971–1977 Alton "Skip" Cowan
- 1977–1981 Arthur Ohanian
- 1981–1991 John Peper
- 1991–1997 Lewis Finch
- 1997–2002 Jane Hammond
- 2002–2014 Cindy Stevenson
- 2014–2017 Dan McMinimee
- 2017 (Mar–Jun) Terry Elliott (interim)
- 2017– 2020 Jason Glass
- 2020–2021 Kristopher Schuh (interim)
- 2021– Tracy Dorland
