= Lakewood High School (Colorado) =

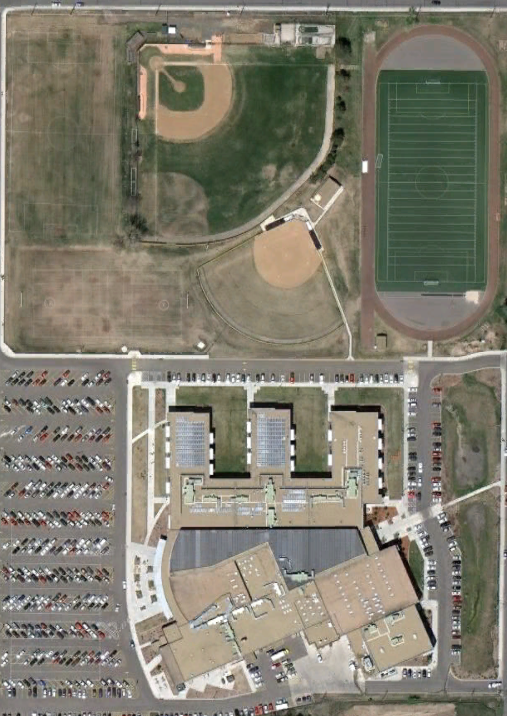
- Satellite view of LHS

Location
- 9700 West Eighth Avenue; Lakewood, Colorado 80215; United States; 39°43′42″N 105°6′23″W

Information
- Type: Public secondary school
- Established: 1928 (98 years ago)
- School district: Jefferson County Public Schools
- CEEB code: 060885
- Principal: Josh Kraft
- Faculty: 150+
- Teaching staff: 95.79 (FTE)
- Enrollment: 1,798 (2023-2024)
- Student to teacher ratio: 18.77
- Colors: Orange and black
- Athletics conference: Colorado High School Activities Association
- Team name: Tigers
- Website: lakewood.jeffcopublicschools.org

Lakewood High School is a public secondary school located in Lakewood, Colorado, United States. It is part of Jefferson County Public Schools. Lakewood was ranked as the 111th best school in the nation by Newsweek in 2006, and as the 108th in 2008.

== History ==
Lakewood High School was established in 1928 at 7655 W 10th Avenue in Lakewood, with elementary and junior high schools on the same campus. The high school moved to its current location at 9700 W. 8th Avenue in summer 1958, and the previous site became the location of the Jefferson County Open School in 1989.

As a result of a bond issue on the 2004 ballot, Lakewood received over $35 million to construct a new school building. Construction began in January 2006 and continued until summer 2007, when the new building had its official opening. It opened for classes at the beginning of the 2007-2008 school year, with students sometimes assisting teachers in moving in.

=== Spoon Game ===
Beginning in 2010, Lakewood High School upperclassmen participated in a student-organized tag-based game, called "The Spoon Game," in which students attempt to eliminate each other by tagging them with a spoon. Each entrant in the Spoon Game pays a fee, which is then distributed to the Junior and Senior winner at the end of the year, along with a charitable donation. The game begins early in the second semester of each year with simple rules. A player is vulnerable if they are not holding a spoon, and may be eliminated by the player with their target card. As the end of the school year nears, the game's rules become more complex, increasing eliminations until only one player remains. Since its inception, the Spoon Game has been played every year except 2020, when the game was cancelled due to the COVID-19 pandemic.

=== 2013 Good Morning America appearance ===
After entering a competition held by the TV show Good Morning America in fall 2013, Lakewood High School won a live concert put on at the high school on October 25, 2013. The high school made a lip dub video to pop star Katy Perry's song "Roar" from the album Prism. The video the high school submitted for the competition gained 2 million views on Vimeo and another 300,000 on YouTube in the first day it was posted. In a selection announced live on the show on October 13, 2013, Perry chose the video from over 1,000 entries from high schools in 44 states. The concert took place in the high school's gymnasium and was not open to the public.

== Academics ==
Lakewood has both honors and Advanced Placement programs. It is also an International Baccalaureate World School, and offers the IB Prep and IB Diploma program, starting when students begin high school.

Lakewood High is ranked by 5280 magazine as one of the top high schools in the metro area.

== Music program ==
=== Instrumental music ===
Lakewood High School has a symphonic band, a wind ensemble, and a percussion ensemble in its concert band program. Lakewood also has a string orchestra program with a concert orchestra, a symphonic orchestra and a chamber orchestra. Lakewood High School's marching band is called the Bengal Regiment. It is the school's largest instrumental ensemble.

=== Choral music ===
Lakewood High School has five choral music ensembles: a men's choir; a women's choir; Kaleidoscope, an elite women's choir; Eclipse, an advanced men’s and women’s mixed choir; and Encore, an a cappella ensemble.

== Athletics ==
- The softball team won two consecutive 4A Colorado High School Activities Association (CHSAA) state championships, in 1997 and 1998.

== Notable people ==
- Mike Gann professional football player
- James J. Heckman, Henry Schultz Distinguished Service Professor of Economics at the University of Chicago; winner of the Sveriges Riksbank Prize in Economic Sciences in Memory of Alfred Nobel 2000 (student)
- Kayln Heffernan, rapper, activist, 2019 Denver mayoral candidate (student)
- Keli McGregor, pro football player and administrator (student)
- Joe Romig, inductee of the College Football Hall of Fame (student)
- Mike Schnitker, professional football player (student)
- Edward Tipper, decorated World War II veteran (teacher)
- Steve Williams, American professional and amateur wrestler, football player and author, known by his ring name as Dr. Death
