= Jefferson Academy Charter School =

Charter school in Colorado, US

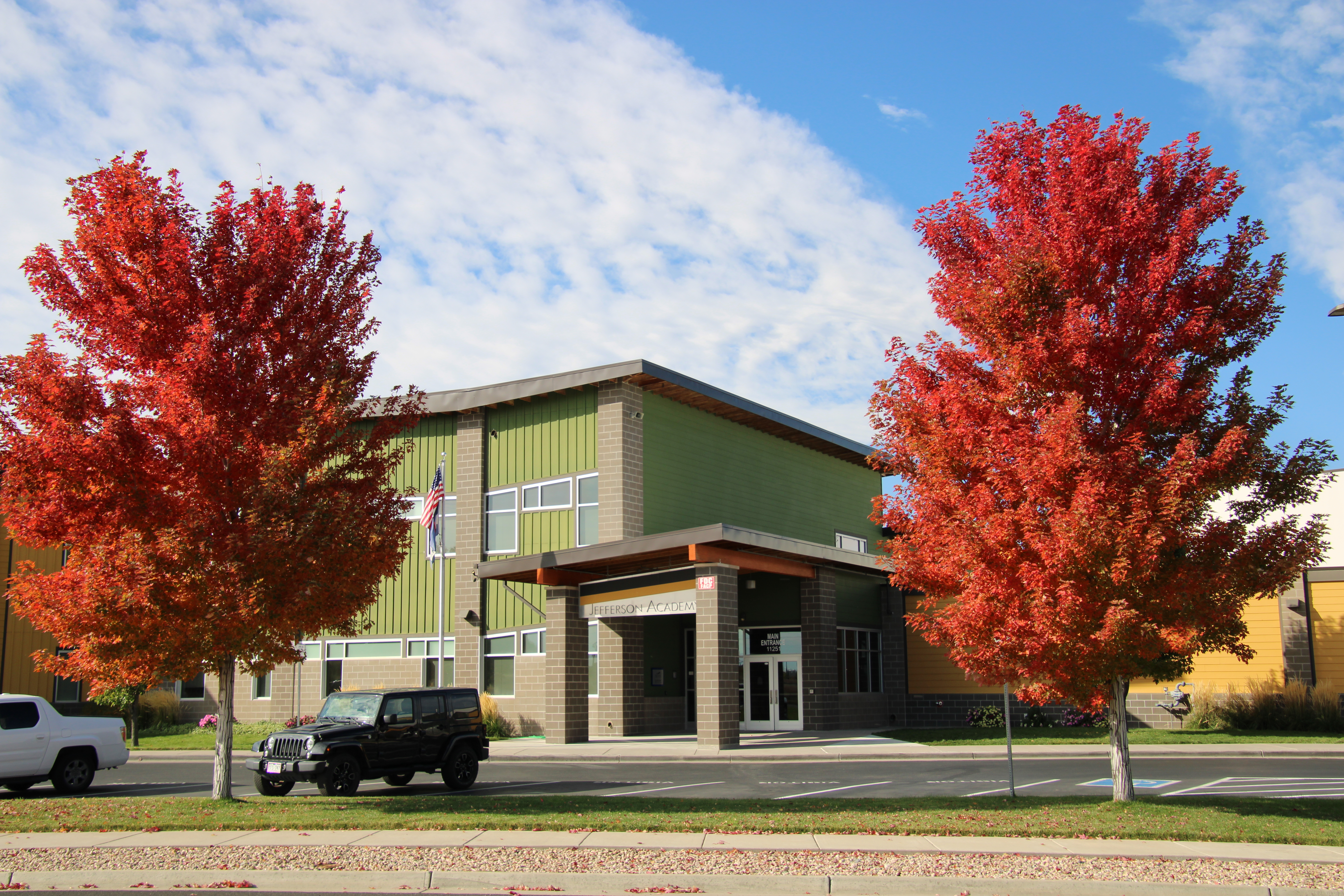
- Main entrance of the Secondary campus.

Location
- Broomfield, Colorado; United States; 39°52′38″N 105°05′08″W

Information
- Type: Charter school
- Established: 1994 (32 years ago)
- School district: Jefferson County School District
- Principal: Ryan Stadler (Secondary) Brendon Feddema (Elementary)
- Grades: K–12
- Colors: Black and gold
- Athletics: 4A/3A Metro League
- Mascot: Jaguars
- Nickname: Jaguars
- Newspaper: The JagWire
- Affiliation: Jefferson County Public Schools
- Website: www.jajags.com

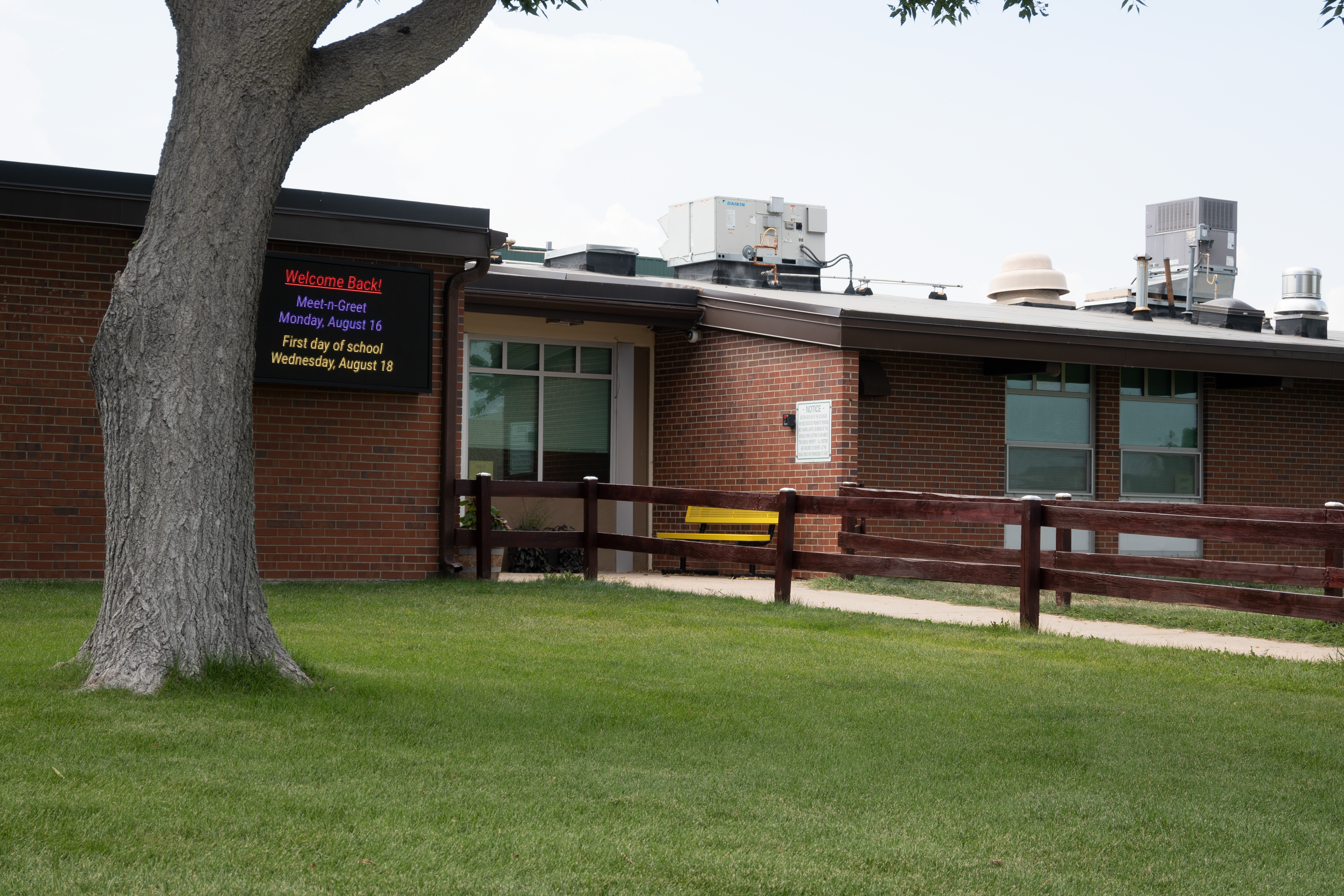
K-6 side entrance and pick up/drop off

Jefferson Academy Charter School or JA is a K-12 charter school in unincorporated Jefferson County, Colorado, United States. It is also known as the Jefferson Academy School of Excellence. Jefferson Academy was founded in 1994

== Notable alumni ==
Jennifer Kupcho. American Profession golfer
