= Lakewood, Colorado =

Home rule city in Jefferson County, Colorado, United States

- Home rule city
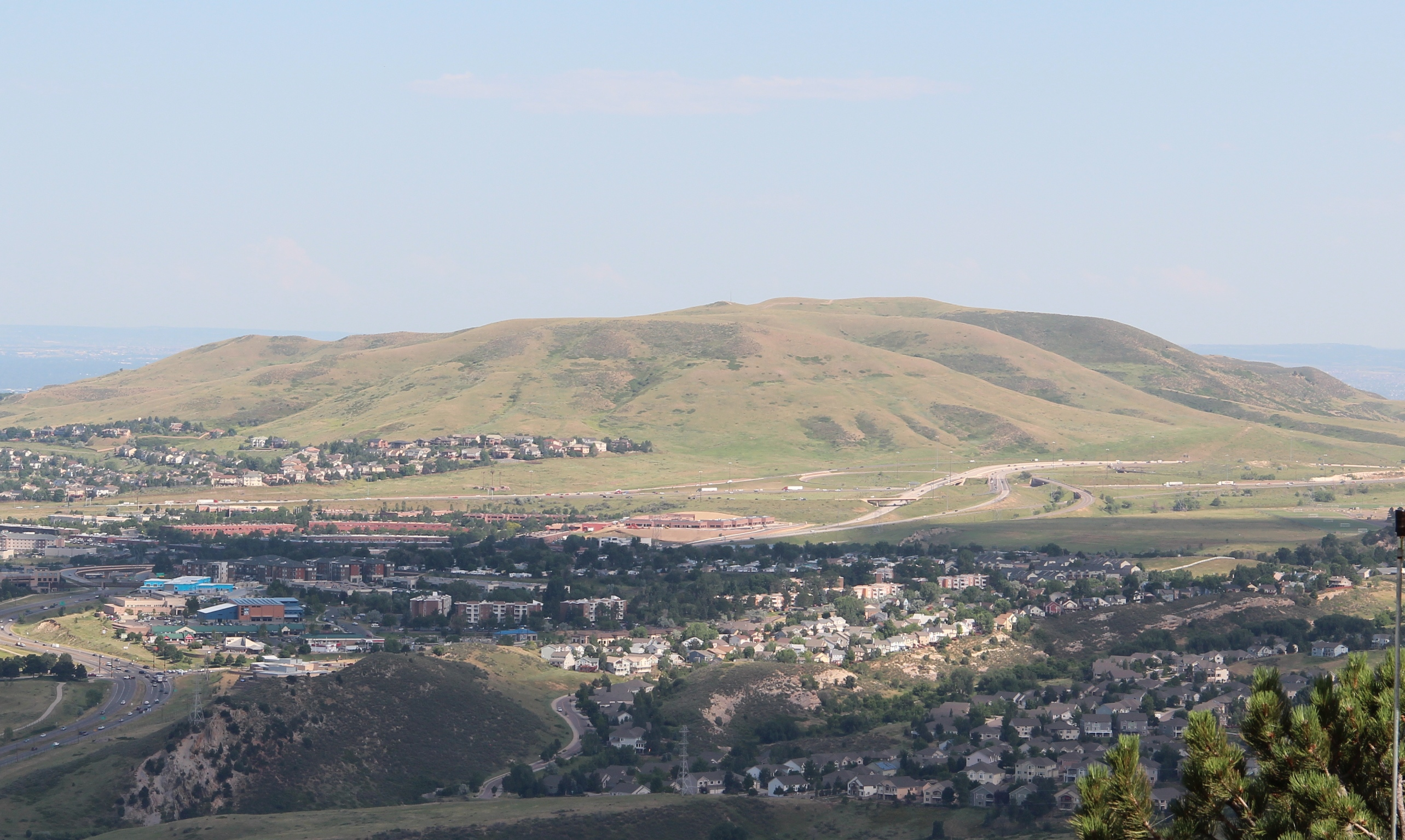
- Green Mountain as seen from Mt. Zion

- Flag
- Interactive map of Lakewood, Colorado
- Location within Colorado Location within the United States
- Coordinates: 39°41′52″N 105°07′02″W
- Country: United States
- State: Colorado
- County: Jefferson
- Platted: July 1, 1889
- Incorporated: June 24, 1969

Government
  - Type: Home rule city
  - Mayor: Wendi Strom

Area
  - Home rule city: 44.647 sq mi (115.635 km^{2})
  - Land: 43.473 sq mi (112.595 km^{2})
  - Water: 1.174 sq mi (3.040 km^{2})
- Elevation: 5,656 ft (1,724 m)

Population (2020)
  - Home rule city: 155,984
  - Estimate (2024): 156,868 ▲
  - Rank: 5th in Colorado; 167th in the United States
  - Density: 3,588/sq mi (1,385/km^{2})
  - Metro: 2,963,821 (19th)
  - CSA: 3,623,560 (17th)
  - Front Range: 5,055,344
- Time zone: UTC−07:00 (MST)
  - Summer (DST): UTC−06:00 (MDT)
- ZIP code: Denver 80214-80215, 80227, 80226-80228, 80232, 80235-80236; Golden 80401; Littleton 80123
- Area codes: 303/720/983
- GNIS city ID: 2411614
- FIPS code: 08-43000
- Website: lakewoodco.gov

Lakewood is the home rule city that is the most populous municipality in Jefferson County, Colorado, United States. The population was 155,984 at the 2020 census, making Lakewood the fifth-most populous city in Colorado and the 167th-most populous city in the U.S. Lakewood is a part of the Denver metropolitan area and a major city of the Front Range Urban Corridor.

The city has a notable student population, as it is home to three higher education institutions: Colorado Christian University, Red Rocks Community College and Rocky Mountain College of Art and Design. Lakewood is also home to the Denver Federal Center, which houses the largest concentration of federal agencies outside of Washington, D.C.

== History ==
The Lakewood region was historically inhabited by the Ute people.

The urban and suburban development of the community known as Lakewood was started in 1889 by Charles Welch and W.A.H. Loveland, who platted a 13-block area along Colfax Avenue west of Denver in eastern Jefferson County. Loveland, the former president of the Colorado Central Railroad, retired to the new community of Lakewood after many years of living in Golden. The Lakewood, Colorado, post office opened on April 21, 1892, although much of the future city was served by the Denver, Colorado, post office.

The City of Lakewood was incorporated on June 24, 1969, as Jefferson City. Soon after, an election was held and the city's name was changed to Lakewood, due to an overwhelming dislike of "Jefferson City" and the belief that it would be confused with existing communities in Colorado and Missouri. At the time of incorporation, the city population was already over 90,000. Before incorporation, Lakewood had no municipal government, relying instead on several water districts, several fire districts, several volunteer-staffed fire districts, and the government of Jefferson County, including the Jefferson County Sheriff. Additionally, some neighborhoods lacked street lights and sidewalks.

Lakewood never had a traditional downtown area. West Colfax Avenue served the metropolitan area as U.S. Route 40 and the main route joining Denver with the Rocky Mountains. As such, Colfax from Harlan west to Kipling and beyond had mostly commercial establishments. In addition to the Jewish Consumptives' Relief Society (JCRS) for tuberculosis patients, the small, frame Methodist Church, and telephone exchange, by the 1950s grocery and drug stores, gas stations, restaurants and taverns, several motels, branch banks, a movie theater, a roller rink, a bowling alley, and used car lots emerged there. Several multiple-business "shopping centers" developed followed by much larger centers at JCRS and Westland. The Villa Italia Mall on West Alameda Avenue, 20 blocks south of Colfax, reflected the southward expansion of the Lakewood settlement and housed a larger concentration of retail space. As the mall went into decline, the Lakewood City Council developed a plan to demolish the Villa Italia Mall and replace it with a new development called Belmar.

In 2011, Lakewood was named an All-America City for the first time.

=== December 2021 shooting ===
On December 27, 2021, a Denver gunman killed three Denver residents and two Lakewood residents before being killed by seriously wounded Lakewood Police Agent Ashley Ferris.

== Geography ==
Lakewood is located at the junction of U.S. Route 6 and Colorado State Highway 121 in central Colorado, the city lies immediately west of Denver and 62 miles (100 km) north-northwest of Colorado Springs.

Lakewood lies in the Colorado Piedmont on the western edge of the Great Plains just east of the Front Range of the southern Rocky Mountains. Green Mountain, 6,854-foot-tall (2,089 m), is located in the far west-central part of the city.

The city is located in the watershed of the South Platte River, and several small tributaries of the river flow generally east through it. From north to south, these include Lakewood Gulch, Weir Gulch, Sanderson Gulch, and Bear Creek. Two tributaries of Lakewood Gulch, Dry Gulch, and McIntyre Gulch flow east through the northern part of the city. Turkey Creek, a tributary of Bear Creek, flows northeast through the far southwestern part of the city. In addition, Lena Gulch, a tributary of Clear Creek to the north, flows east then north through the extreme northwestern part of the city.

Several small lakes and reservoirs are in Lakewood. The Soda Lakes lie in the extreme southwestern part of the city. East of them lies Bear Creek Lake, a reservoir fed by Bear Creek and Turkey Creek. Clustered near each other in central Lakewood are Main Reservoir, East Reservoir, Smith Reservoir, Kendrick Lake, and Cottonwood Lake. Northeast of them lies Kountze Lake. In the northwestern part of the city, Lena Gulch both feeds and drains Maple Grove Reservoir. In the extreme southern part of the city lies Bowles Reservoir No. 1 and, just outside the city limits to the reservoir's northeast, Marston Lake.

At the 2020 United States Census, the town had a total area of 28,574 acres (115.635 km^{2}), including 751 acres (3.040 km^{2}) of water.

As a suburb of Denver, Lakewood is part of both the greater Denver metropolitan area and the Front Range Urban Corridor. It borders other communities on all sides, including Wheat Ridge to the north, Edgewater to the northeast, Denver to the east and southeast, Dakota Ridge to the south, Morrison to the southwest, and Golden, West Pleasant View, East Pleasant View, and Applewood to the northwest.

=== Climate ===
According to the Köppen Climate Classification system, Lakewood has a cold semi-arid climate, abbreviated Bsk on climate maps.

Climate data for Lakewood, Colorado, 1991–2020 normals, extremes 1962–present
Month	Jan	Feb	Mar	Apr	May	Jun	Jul	Aug	Sep	Oct	Nov	Dec	Year
Record high °F (°C)	74 (23)	77 (25)	84 (29)	86 (30)	94 (34)	104 (40)	103 (39)	101 (38)	96 (36)	89 (32)	82 (28)	75 (24)	104 (40)
Mean maximum °F (°C)	65.9 (18.8)	65.6 (18.7)	74.0 (23.3)	78.4 (25.8)	86.6 (30.3)	94.9 (34.9)	97.5 (36.4)	95.0 (35.0)	91.2 (32.9)	82.4 (28.0)	73.1 (22.8)	65.2 (18.4)	98.6 (37.0)
Mean daily maximum °F (°C)	44.8 (7.1)	45.3 (7.4)	53.4 (11.9)	59.0 (15.0)	67.9 (19.9)	79.8 (26.6)	85.9 (29.9)	83.7 (28.7)	76.2 (24.6)	63.4 (17.4)	52.1 (11.2)	44.6 (7.0)	63.0 (17.2)
Daily mean °F (°C)	32.9 (0.5)	33.5 (0.8)	41.0 (5.0)	47.2 (8.4)	56.0 (13.3)	66.7 (19.3)	72.8 (22.7)	70.6 (21.4)	62.4 (16.9)	50.0 (10.0)	40.0 (4.4)	32.3 (0.2)	50.4 (10.2)
Mean daily minimum °F (°C)	21.1 (−6.1)	21.6 (−5.8)	28.6 (−1.9)	35.3 (1.8)	44.1 (6.7)	53.5 (11.9)	59.6 (15.3)	57.5 (14.2)	48.6 (9.2)	36.6 (2.6)	27.8 (−2.3)	20.0 (−6.7)	37.9 (3.2)
Mean minimum °F (°C)	0.3 (−17.6)	1.1 (−17.2)	11.0 (−11.7)	19.7 (−6.8)	29.6 (−1.3)	41.5 (5.3)	50.6 (10.3)	47.8 (8.8)	34.6 (1.4)	19.3 (−7.1)	7.6 (−13.6)	−0.3 (−17.9)	−6.8 (−21.6)
Record low °F (°C)	−26 (−32)	−23 (−31)	−11 (−24)	−1 (−18)	19 (−7)	27 (−3)	37 (3)	40 (4)	16 (−9)	5 (−15)	−7 (−22)	−25 (−32)	−26 (−32)
Average precipitation inches (mm)	0.64 (16)	0.77 (20)	1.33 (34)	2.36 (60)	2.62 (67)	2.06 (52)	2.00 (51)	1.89 (48)	1.38 (35)	1.14 (29)	0.82 (21)	0.53 (13)	17.54 (446)
Average snowfall inches (cm)	8.0 (20)	8.6 (22)	9.2 (23)	9.1 (23)	1.7 (4.3)	0.0 (0.0)	0.0 (0.0)	0.0 (0.0)	0.3 (0.76)	5.2 (13)	9.2 (23)	6.7 (17)	58.0 (147)
Average precipitation days (≥ 0.01 in)	4.5	4.9	5.6	7.2	10.3	8.4	9.4	9.7	7.2	5.7	4.4	3.9	81.2
Average snowy days (≥ 0.1 in)	3.6	4.2	3.7	2.4	0.6	0.0	0.0	0.0	0.1	1.3	2.6	3.2	21.7
Source 1: NOAA
Source 2: National Weather Service

== Demographics ==
Historical population
Census	Pop.	Note	%±
1960	19,338		—
1970	92,743		379.6%
1980	113,808		22.7%
1990	126,481		11.1%
2000	144,126		14.0%
2010	142,980		−0.8%
2020	155,984		9.1%
2024 (est.)	156,868	▲	0.6%
U.S. Decennial Census

=== 2020 census ===
Lakewood, Colorado – racial and ethnic composition Note: the US Census treats Hispanic/Latino as an ethnic category. This table excludes Latinos from the racial categories and assigns them to a separate category. Hispanics/Latinos may be of any race.
Race / ethnicity (NH = Non-Hispanic)	Pop 2000	Pop 2010	Pop 2020	% 2000	% 2010	% 2020
White alone (NH)	113,755	101,504	103,355	78.93%	70.99%	66.26%
Black or African American alone (NH)	1,910	1,924	2,733	1.33%	1.35%	1.75%
Native American or Alaska Native alone (NH)	1,085	987	1,106	0.75%	0.69%	0.71%
Asian alone (NH)	3,854	4,347	5,798	2.67%	3.04%	3.72%
Pacific Islander alone (NH)	112	144	212	0.08%	0.10%	0.14%
Some Other Race alone (NH)	175	205	799	0.12%	0.14%	0.51%
Mixed-race or multi-Rrcial (NH)	2,286	2,402	6,558	1.59%	1.68%	4.20%
Hispanic or Latino (any race)	20,949	31,467	35,423	14.54%	22.01%	22.71%
Total	144,126	142,980	155,984	100.00%	100.00%	100.00%

=== 2010 census ===
As of the 2010 census, 142,980 people, 61,986 households, and 35,882 families were residing in the city. The population density was 3,334.4 inhabitants per square mile (1,287.4/km^{2}). Its 65,758 housing units averaged 1,533.5 per square mile (591.9/km^{2}). The racial makeup of the city was 82.9% White, 3.1% Asian, 1.6% Black, 1.4% American Indian, 0.1% Pacific Islander, 7.7% from other races, and 3.3% from two or more races. Hispanics and Latinos of any race were 22.0% of the population.

Of the 61,986 households, 26.8% had children under the age of 18 living with them, 41.1% were married couples living together, 5.0% had a male householder with no wife present, 11.9% had a female householder with no husband present, and 42.1% were not families. About 33.5% of all households were made up of individuals, and 10.2% had someone living alone who was 65 years of age or older. The average household size was 2.27, and the average family size was 2.92.

The distribution of the population by age was 20.8% under the age of 18, 9.6% from 18 to 24, 27.1% from 25 to 44, 28.0% from 45 to 64, and 14.5% who were 65 years of age or older. The median age was 39.2 years. The gender makeup of the city was 48.9% male and 51.1% female.

The median income for a household in the city was $52,960, and for a family was $66,947. Males had a median income of $46,907 versus $41,476 for females. The city's per capita income was $30,027. About 9.1% of families and 11.7% of the population were below the poverty line, including 20.3% of those under age 18 and 6.1% of those age 65 or over.

== Economy ==
Lakewood's economy is diverse, while the largest employers are the government. Companies based in Lakewood include Einstein Bros. Bagels, FirstBank, and The Integer Group.

As of 2013, 67.3% of the population over the age of 16 was in the labor force. 0.1% were in the armed forces, and 67.3% were in the civilian labor force with 61.1% employed and 6.2% unemployed. The occupational composition of the employed civilian labor force was 38.6% in management, business, science, and arts; 25.9% in sales and office occupations; 16.9% in service occupations; 9.9% in production, transportation, and material moving; and 8.7% in natural resources, construction, and maintenance. The three industries employing the largest percentages of the working civilian labor force were educational services, health care, and social assistance (18.4%); professional, scientific, and management, and administrative and waste management services (13.8%); and retail trade (11.9%).

The cost of living index in Lakewood, compared to a U.S. average of 100, is 107.4. As of 2013, the median home value in the city was $238,500, the median selected monthly owner cost was $1,546 for housing units with a mortgage and $442 for those without, and the median gross rent was $940. In 2026, Lakewood voters struck down a zoning reform that had enabled the construction of duplexes, triplexes and multi-family housing in neighborhoods previously exclusively zoned for single-family housing.

=== Top employers ===
According to the city's 2023 annual report, the top employers in the city are:

Top employers by employee count
Rank	Employer	Number of employees
1	Denver Federal Center	8,000
2	Jefferson County School District R-1	3,700
3	State of Colorado	2,610
4	St. Anthony Hospital	1,774
5	Terumo BCT	1,709
6	FirstBank	1,569
7	City of Lakewood	1,438
8	Red Rocks Community College	961
9	Encore Electric	892
10	Colorado Christian University	725

== Government ==
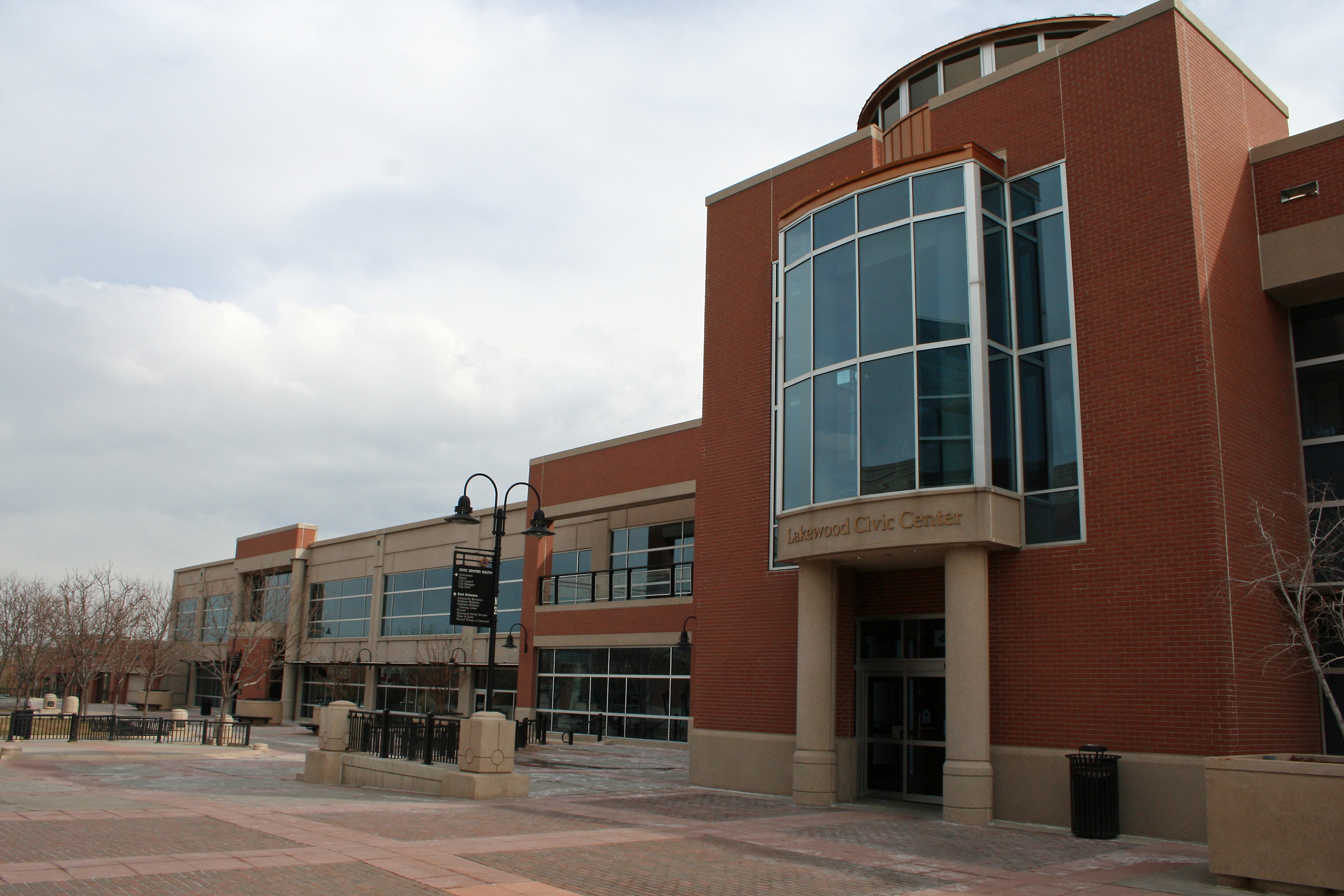
The Lakewood Civic Center (2009)

Lakewood maintains a council-manager form of government. Citizens elect a city council consisting of the mayor, who is elected at-large, and 10 city council members, 2 from each of the city's five geographical wards. The mayor and the council members assert the policies for the operation of the city government. The current city manager, Kathleen Hodgson, is the longest-tenured city manager in the State of Colorado.

The current mayor is Wendi Strom. Council members Jeslin Shahrezaei and Glenda Sinks represent Ward 1; Sophia Mayott-Guerrero and Isabel Cruz represent Ward 2; Roger Low and Rebekah Stewart represent Ward 3; Rich Olver and David Rein represent Ward 4; and Jacob LaBure and Paula Nystrom represent Ward 5.

The City of Lakewood falls into Colorado House District 26, parts of House District 24, and House District 23. Lakewood is represented in the state house by Reps. Chris Kennedy, Kerry Tipper, and Monica Duran.

=== List of mayors ===
- James Richey, 1969–1977
- Charles E. Whitlock, 1977–1979
- Bill Reitler, 1979–1983
- Linda Shaw, c.1988
- Linda Morton, 1991–1999
- Steve Burkholder, 1999–c.2000, c.2003
- Bob Murphy, c.2011–2015
- Adam Paul, c.2015–2023
- Wendi Strom, c.2023–present

== Education ==
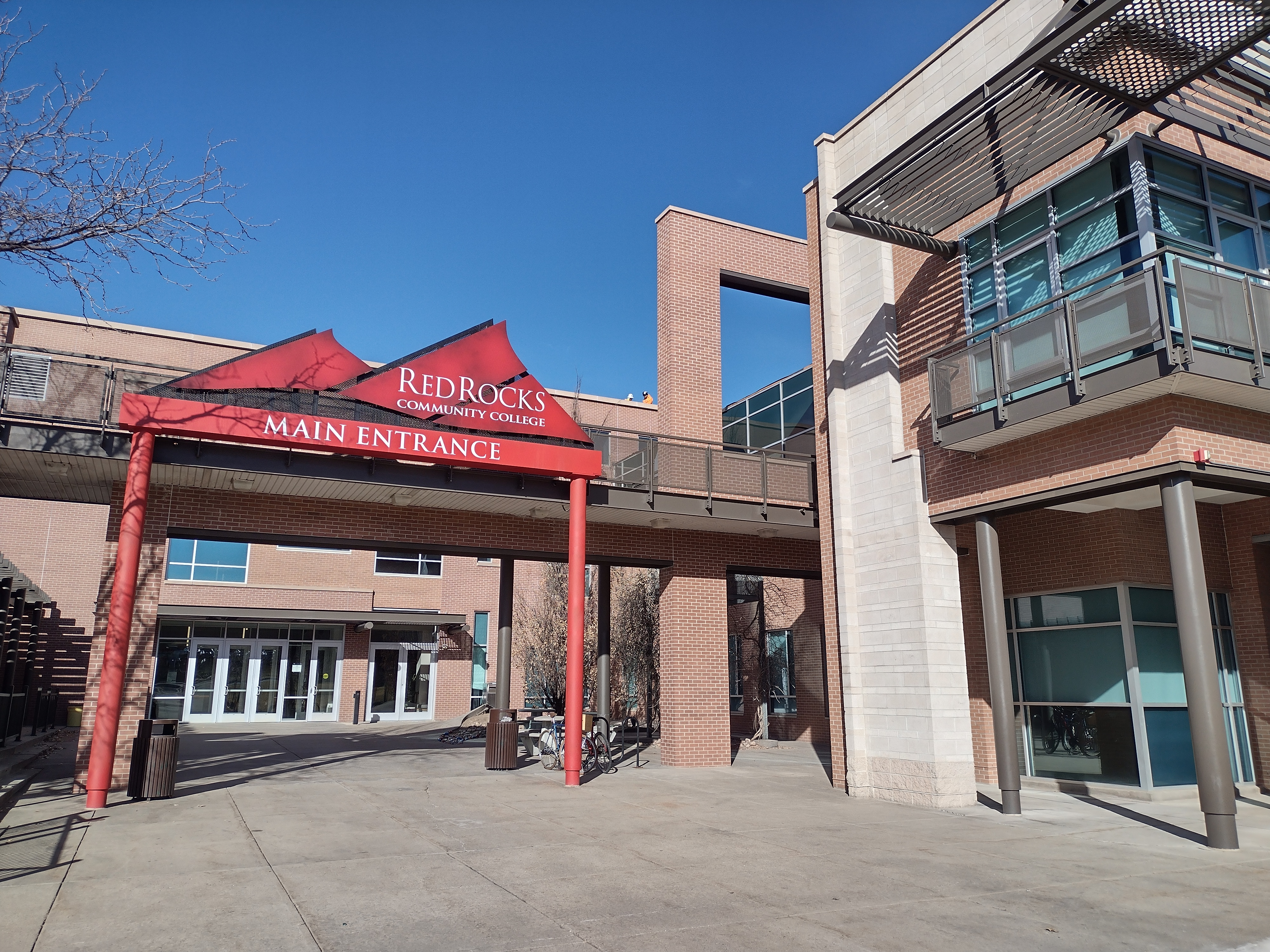
Red Rocks Community College main entrance, Lakewood (2023)

Lakewood is within Jefferson County School District R-1.

Lakewood also houses Lakewood High School, Green Mountain High School, Bear Creek High School, Brady Exploration High School, Alameda International High School, and International Baccalaureate schools in Jefferson County, as well as the private Colorado Academy.

Lakewood is home to several colleges and universities, including Colorado Christian University, Rocky Mountain College of Art and Design, Red Rocks Community College, and the Colorado School of Trades.

The town is served by the Jefferson County Public Library.

== Transportation ==
=== Highways ===
Nine highways run through the city of Lakewood:

- Interstate 70 runs east–west from Utah to Maryland. It enters the city from Applewood to the east and exits into West Pleasant View to the west.
- US 6 (6th Avenue Freeway) runs east-west within the city. It enters from Denver to the east before going west into West Pleasant View.
- US 40 (West Colfax Avenue) enters Lakewood from Denver to the east before continuing west into West Pleasant View.
- US 285 connects to Lakewood from Denver to the west before entering Dakota Ridge. It runs along much of the southern edge of the city.
- State Highway 8 (Morrison Road) begins in the city of Lakewood at an intersection with South Wadsworth Boulevard before continuing west into Morrison.
- State Highway 95 (South Sheridan Boulevard) defines much of Lakewood's eastern border with Denver.
- State Highway 121 (South Wadsworth Boulevard) enters the city from Wheat Ridge to the north and continues into Denver to the south.
- State Highway 391 (South Kipling Street) begins in Lakewood at an intersection with US 285 before continuing into Wheat Ridge.
- State Highway 470 runs along the western edge of the city.

=== Mass transit ===
Bus and light rail service within the city, and to other areas in the metropolitan area, is provided by the Regional Transportation District. Light rail service to Lakewood began on April 26, 2013, with the opening of the W Line. Seven light rail stations are located within the city, all of which are located along the W Line.

Intercity transportation is provided by Bustang. Federal Center station in Lakewood is along Bustang's West Line, which connects Denver to Grand Junction.

== Points of interest ==
Landmarks and historical points of interest include:

- Belmar is the town center with a mix of retail, residential, cultural, and public space.
  - The Laboratory of Art and Ideas at Belmar was located in Belmar until May 2009, and that location is now occupied by:
  - the Colorado Campus of the Ohio Center for Broadcasting, a private trade school for the radio and television industry.
  - Belmar has a designated Arts District that houses several artist studios and several gallery spaces, and
  - "Working with Artists", a nonprofit fine-art photography school.
- Lakewood Cultural Center features a theater, gallery space, and art classrooms.
- Heritage Lakewood Belmar Park is a 20th-century museum and festival grounds, with several historic buildings, and is located near Kountze Lake; the site formerly housed the Belmar family mansion.
- At William Fredrick Hayden Park in the foothills of Green Mountain, the Colorado National Guard previously used the north side for artillery practice. Since 2012 the Department of Defense Military Munitions Response Program has financed investigations to identify unexploded ordnance there.
- The 40 West Arts District includes a bike and "walking art experience" along the light rail line.

== Sister cities ==
Lakewood has four sister cities, as designated by Sister Cities International:

- Chester, Cheshire, United Kingdom
- Portsmouth, Hampshire, United Kingdom, also a Friendship City
- Stade, Lower Saxony, Germany
- Sutherland Shire, Sydney, New South Wales, Australia

== See also ==
- Front Range Urban Corridor
