= Union High School (Colorado) =

- U.S. National Register of Historic Places
- Colorado State Register of Historic Properties
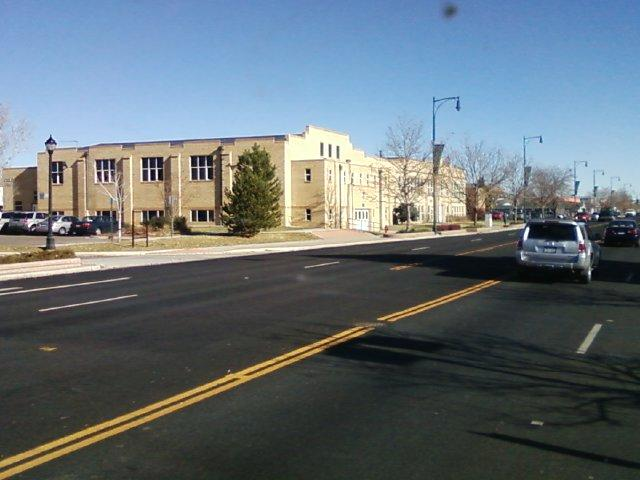

- Location within Colorado Location within the United States
- Location: 3455 W. 72nd Ave., Westminster, Colorado
- Coordinates: 39.827778°N 105.032222°W
- Area: 1.4 acres (0.57 ha)
- Built: 1929
- Architect: Public Works Administration et al.
- Architectural style: Art Deco
- NRHP reference No.: 99001665
- CSRHP No.: 5AM.895
- Added to NRHP: January 14, 2000

The Union High School in Westminster, Colorado is an Art Deco style high school built in 1929 that was the first high school serving the Westminster area of Adams County, Colorado. The original building was intended to be built at a cost of 21,500 dollars. The school saw its last graduating class in 1949, when the school was converted to a junior high school. The school building is now a part of the campus of Colorado STEM Academy, operated by Westminster Public Schools.

The school was listed on the National Register of Historic Places in 2000.

== Architecture ==
The building is a two-story Art Deco style building, approximately 210 ft. by 115 ft. in dimensions. An addition of a gymnasium and classroom wing was made in 1939 to the west of the original building using funding from the Public Works Administration. The original building is a steel frame structure with a blonde brick veneer of wire cut brick with a distinctive embossed surface swirl made by wire placed on the face of the brick molds. The building is mostly made of blonde brick, with dark red brick used as accents. the 1939 addition more than doubled the size of the building. In the late 1960s, a metal shop building was built behind the school and is considered to be a non-contributing building. In 1998, the original windows were replaced with new tinted vinyl ones.

Despite extensive research in all the known archives, no information could be found establishing the identity of the school's architect or builder.

== See also ==
- National Register of Historic Places listings in Adams County, Colorado
