= Don Fletcher =

Donald or Don Fletcher may refer to:

- Donald Fletcher (1849–1929), American real estate businessman
- Don Fletcher (ice hockey) (1931–2022), Canadian ice hockey player
- Don Fletcher, character in All Over Town
- Don Fletcher (footballer) (born 1958), Australian rules footballer for Hawthorn
