= Gregory House (disambiguation) =

Gregory House is the main character of the American television series House.

Gregory House also may refer to:

== Structures ==
It may refer the following structures:

Please note: U.S. sites listed on the National Register of Historic Places (NRHP) are distinguished by the county (as well as the state) within which their respective locations lie.

=== Arkansas ===
- Gregory House (Augusta, Arkansas), Augusta, Arkansas, (NRHP) in Woodruff County
- Wilson-Pittman-Campbell-Gregory House, Fayetteville, Arkansas, (NRHP) in Washington County

=== Florida ===
- Willoughby Gregory House, Quincy, Florida, (NRHP) in Gadsden County
- Gregory House at Torreya State Park, in Florida
- Judge Henry F. Gregory House, Vero Beach, Florida, (NRHP) in Indian River County

=== Kentucky ===
- Gregory-Barlow Place, Mooresville, Kentucky, (NRHP) in Washington County
- Peter Gregory House, Union, Kentucky, (NRHP) in Boone County

=== Michigan ===
- Richard and Mary Woodward Gregory House, Augusta, Michigan, (NRHP) in Kalamazoo County
- Karl D. Gregory Cooperative House, University of Michigan, Ann Arbor, Michigan

=== Elsewhere ===
- William J. Gregory House, Westminster, Colorado, (NRHP) in Adams County
- Gregory House (Poughkeepsie, New York), (NRHP) in Dutchess County
- Gregory House (New London, Ohio), (NRHP) in Huron County
- Paulson-Gregory House, Newberg, Oregon, (NRHP) in Yamhill County

== Other uses ==
- Gregory House, a fictional hotel, the setting of the Japanese anime TV cartoon show Gregory Horror Show

== See also ==
- House (surname)
- Gregory (surname)
- House (disambiguation)
- Gregory (disambiguation)
