= Richard and Mary =

Richard and Mary may refer to:

- Richard and Mary Parker
- Richard and Mary Woodward Gregory House
- Richard and Mary Alice Frank House
