= Granville Fuller House =

Historic house in Colorado, United States

- U.S. National Register of Historic Places
- Colorado State Register of Historic Properties
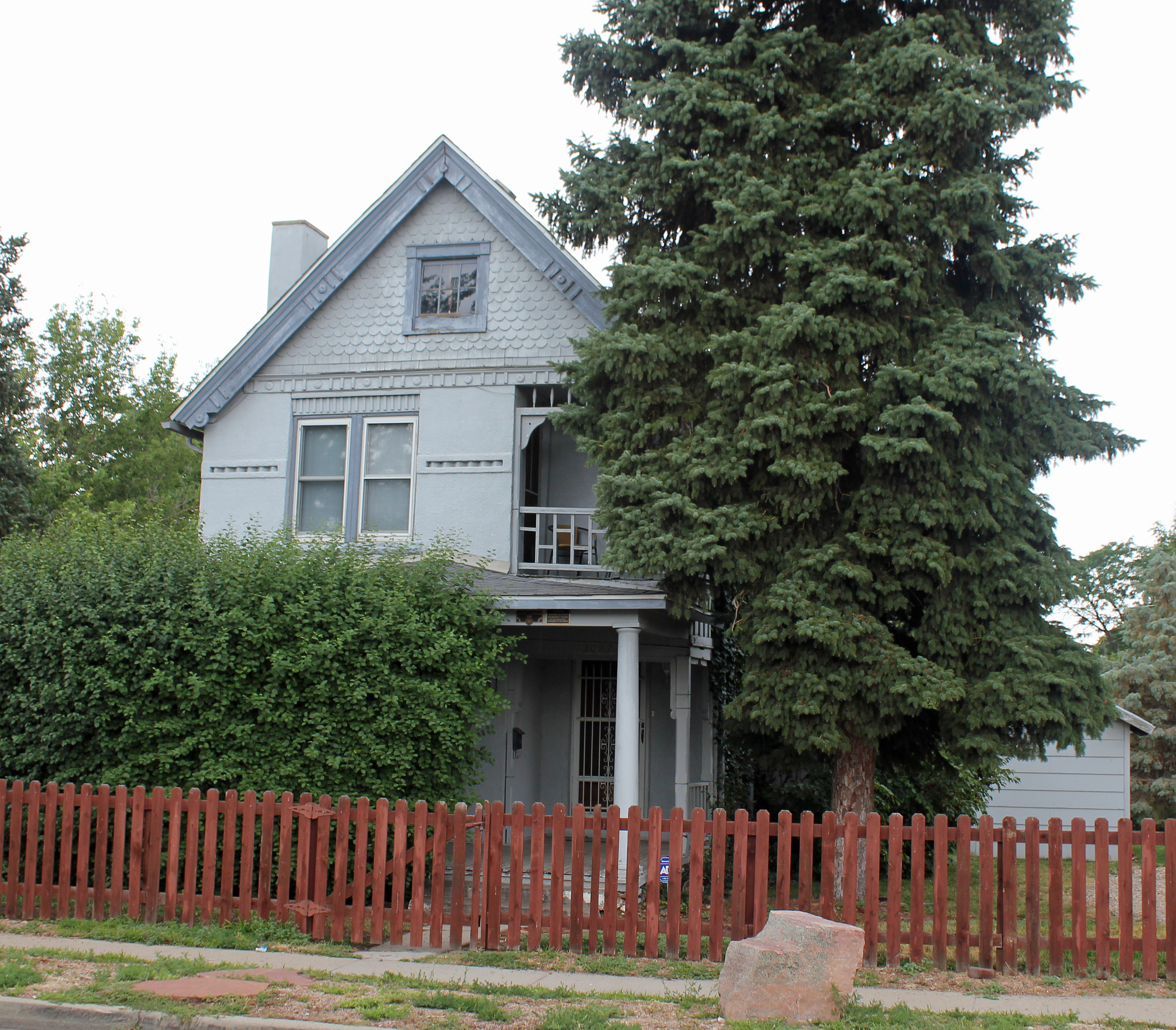

- Location within Colorado
- Location: 2027 Galena St., Aurora, Colorado
- Coordinates: 39.74805°N 104.86959°W
- Built: 1892
- Architectural style: Queen Anne
- NRHP reference No.: 12000242
- CSRHP No.: 5AM.177
- Added to NRHP: May 1, 2012

The Granville Fuller House is a Queen Anne style home located at 2027 Galena St, in Aurora, Colorado, United States. It was built in 1892, and is listed on the National Register of Historic Places. The house is one of only a few surviving and intact houses commissioned by Aurora's founder, real estate developer Donald Fletcher.

== Architecture ==
The house is a Queen Anne brick residence. It was covered with stucco that was scored to look like stone. The house has the characteristic asymmetric design with a steep roof and bay windows that are characteristic of the style.

== See also ==
- National Register of Historic Places listings in Adams County, Colorado
