= Blanche A. Wilson House =

Historic house in Colorado, United States

- U.S. National Register of Historic Places
- Colorado State Register of Historic Properties
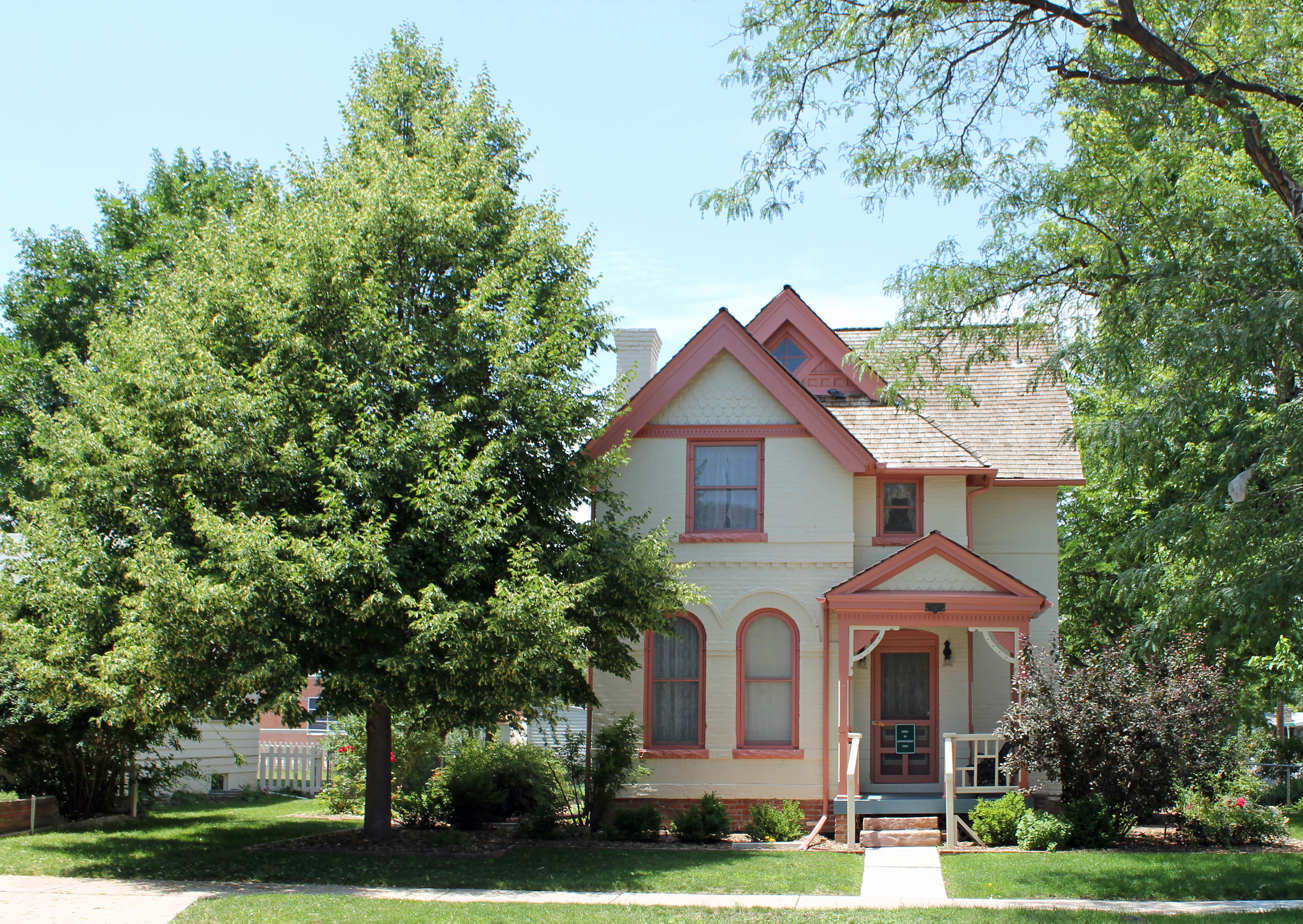
- The house in 2011.
- Location: 1671 Galena Street, Aurora, Colorado
- Coordinates: 39.7436°N 104.8696°W
- Built: 1890
- Architect: Donald Fletcher
- Architectural style: Queen Anne
- NRHP reference No.: 96001278
- CSRHP No.: 5AM.173
- Added to NRHP: November 7, 1996

Blanche A. Wilson House, also known as Centennial House, is a historic house in Aurora, Colorado that now serves as a museum. It is open for tour by the Aurora Historical Society on the second Sunday of the month in the summer season.

== See also ==
- National Register of Historic Places listings in Adams County, Colorado
