= Harris Park School =

- U.S. National Register of Historic Places
- Colorado State Register of Historic Properties
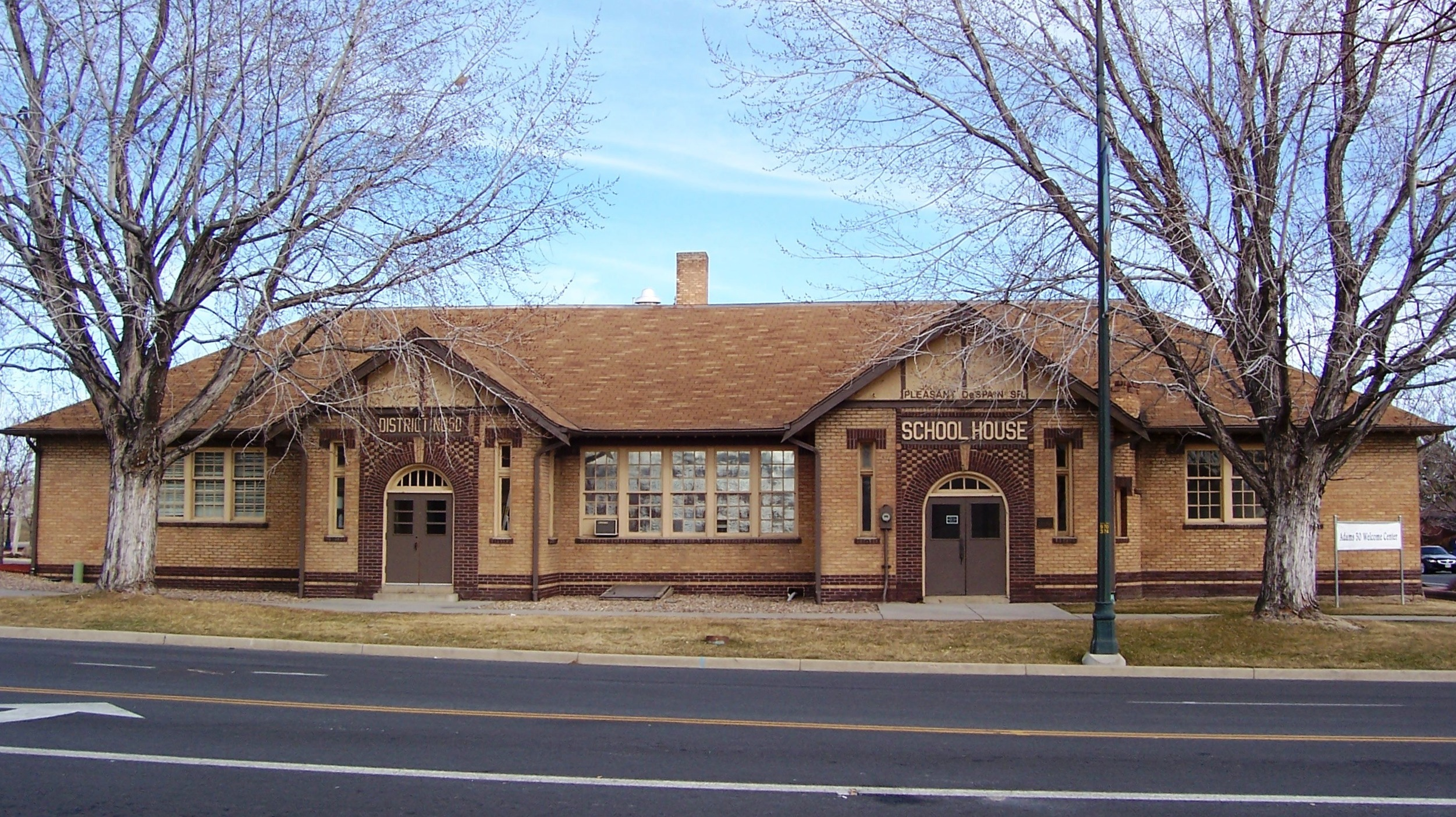

- Location within Colorado Location within the United States
- Location: 7200 Lowell Blvd., Westminster, Colorado
- Coordinates: 39.827778°N 105.033333°W
- Built: 1892-99
- Architectural style: Craftsman
- NRHP reference No.: 90000868
- CSRHP No.: 5AM.442
- Added to NRHP: August 30, 1990

The Harris Park School is a school building in Westminster, Colorado that was built from 1892–1899. The building was originally Romanesque Revival in architecture style, but was remodeled in the 1920s to incorporate the Craftsman style.

The building continues to serve schoolchildren today, now under the name of Pleasant DeSpain, Sr. School. The property was listed on the National Register of Historic Places in 1990.

== See also ==
- National Register of Historic Places listings in Adams County, Colorado
