= Bob Briggs (Colorado politician) =

Robert "Bob" Briggs (December 24, 1937 - December 2, 2021) was an American businessman in the horticulture industry and a politician in Colorado. He served in the Colorado legislature. A Republican, he was elected to the Colorado House of Representatives from District 29 in 2004.

Born in Greeley, Colorado, Briggs was one of eight siblings. He graduated from Westminster High School in Westminster, Colorado. He received his undergraduate and graduate degrees in horticulture from Colorado State University. In 1957 he married Shirley Abbott. He grew carnations in a greenhouse. He served as a county commissioner in Adams County, Colorado. He also served on Westminster's city council. In 2020 a video of him recounting his history was made.

He married and had two children.
