= Bromley Farm–Koizuma Hishinuma Farm =

- U.S. National Register of Historic Places
- U.S. Historic district
- Colorado State Register of Historic Properties
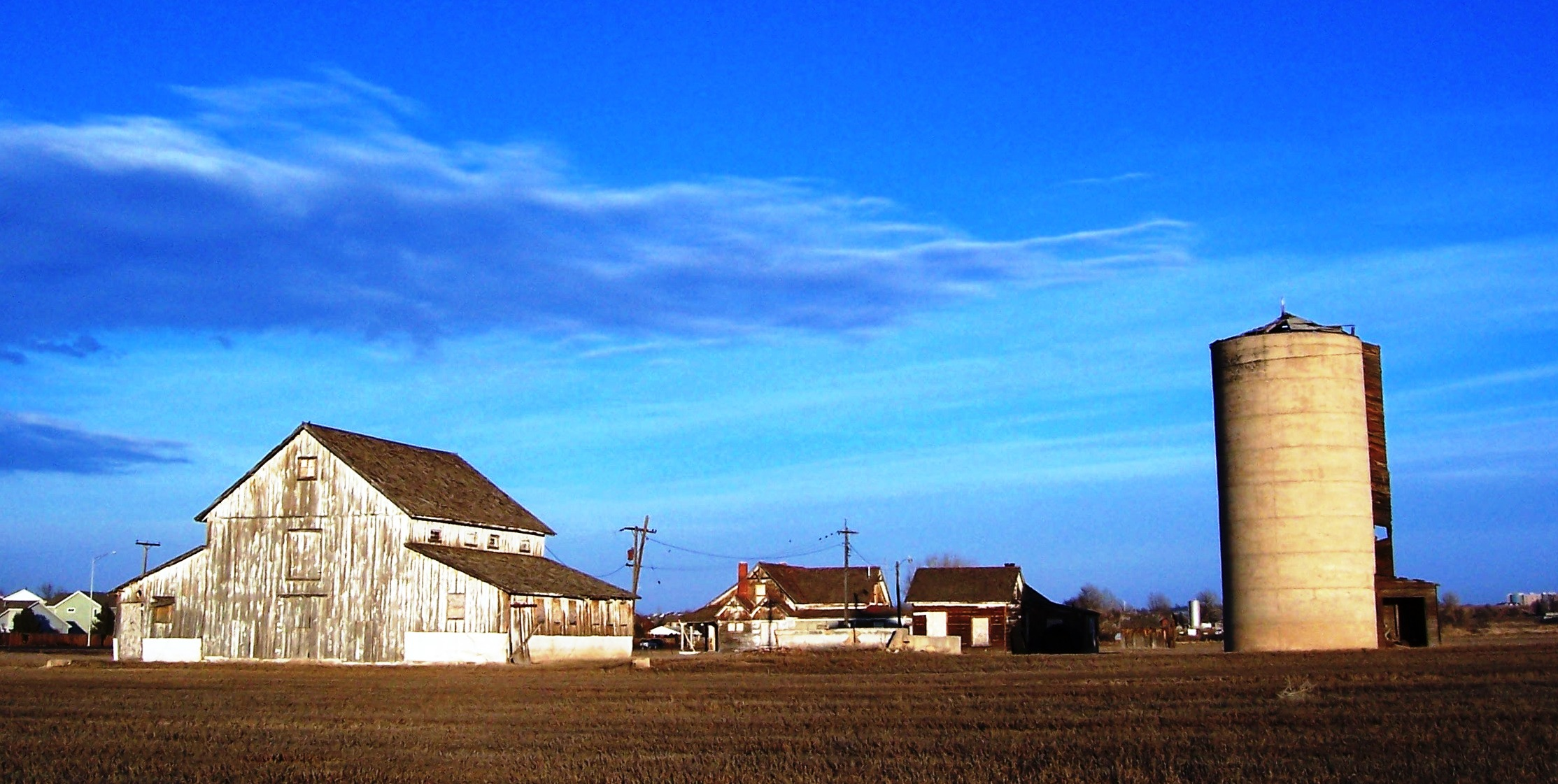
- Buildings on the farm

- Location within Colorado Location within the United States
- Location: 15820 E. 152nd Ave., Brighton, Colorado
- Coordinates: 39°58′17″N 104°48′5″W
- Area: 9.6 acres (3.9 ha)
- Built: 1899
- Architectural style: Late Victorian, Late 19th And 20th Century Revivals
- NRHP reference No.: 07000811
- CSRHP No.: 5AM.1841
- Added to NRHP: August 16, 2007

The Bromley Farm–Koizuma Hishinuma Farm is a historic farmstead in the vicinity of Brighton, Colorado, United States. Established shortly before 1899, it includes a complex of four buildings and multiple other historic structures. In 2007, the farm was designated a historic district and listed on the National Register of Historic Places because of its historically significant architecture.

It was a home of settler Emmet Ayers Bromley, who came to Colorado in 1877. Bromley was president of the First National Bank of Brighton and of the Gibraltar Oil Company. He served in the Colorado House of Representatives and in the Colorado Senate.

== See also ==
- National Register of Historic Places listings in Adams County, Colorado
