= William J. Gregory House =

Historic house in Colorado, United States

- U.S. National Register of Historic Places
- U.S. Historic district
- Colorado State Register of Historic Properties
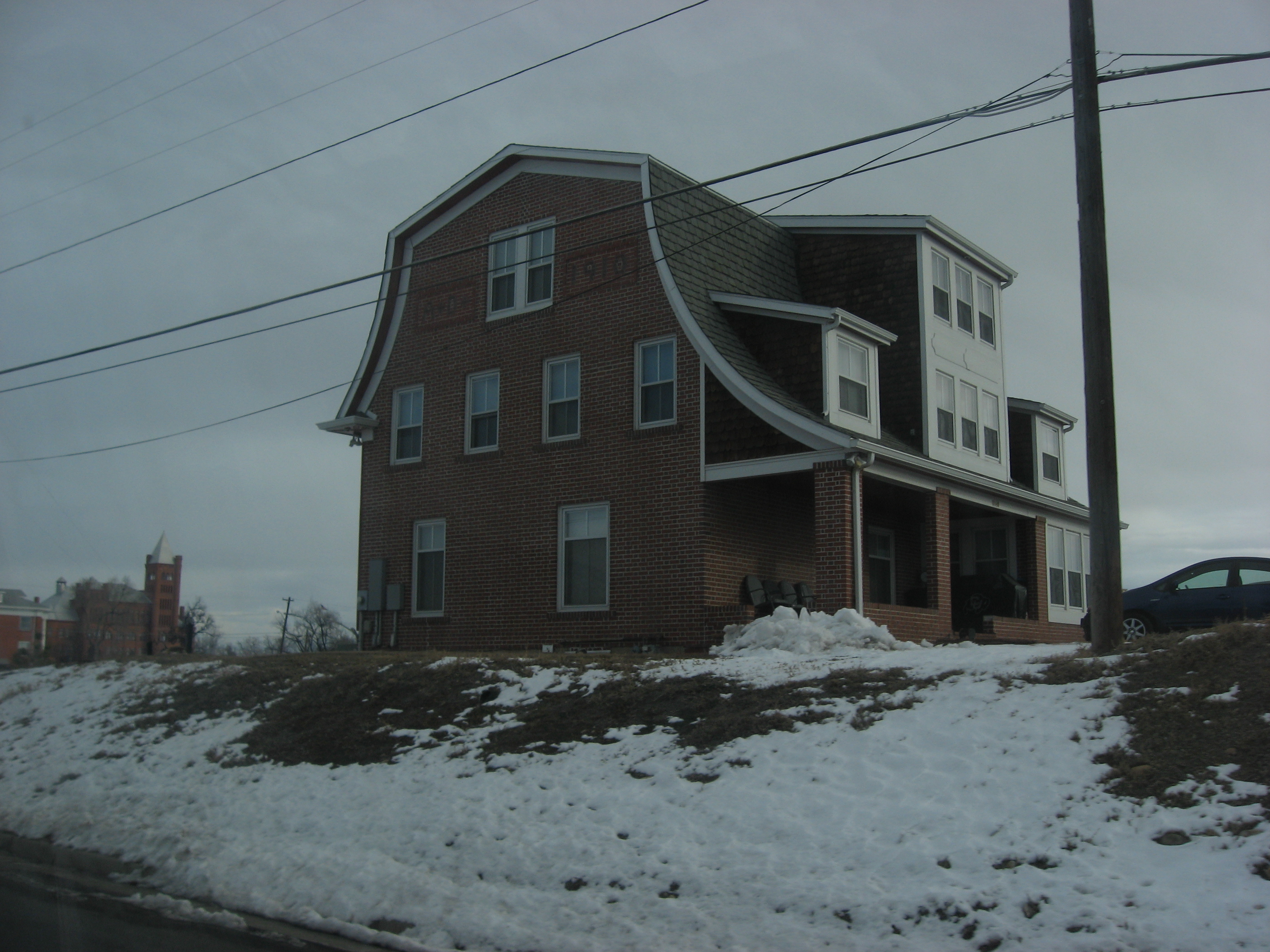

- Location within Colorado Location within the United States
- Location: 8140 Lowell Blvd. Westminster, Colorado
- Coordinates: 39°50′40″N 105°2′1″W
- Area: 1.4 acres (0.57 ha)
- Built: 1910
- Architectural style: Dutch Colonial Revival
- NRHP reference No.: 96000166
- CSRHP No.: 5AM.899
- Added to NRHP: February 23, 1996

The William J. Gregory House is a historic house located at 8140 Lowell Boulevard in Westminster, Colorado. It was listed on the National Register of Historic Places in 1996.

It is a two-and-a-half-story Dutch Colonial Revival-style brick house.

It was built in 1910 as one of the earliest homes in the original townsite of Westminster.

== See also ==
- National Register of Historic Places listings in Adams County, Colorado
