= National Register of Historic Places listings in Adams County, Colorado =

Location of Adams County in Colorado

This is a list of the National Register of Historic Places listings in Adams County, Colorado.

This is intended to be a complete list of the properties and districts on the National Register of Historic Places in Adams County, Colorado, United States. The locations of National Register properties and districts for which the latitude and longitude coordinates are included below, may be seen in a map.

There are 20 properties and districts listed on the National Register in the county. Another property was once listed but has been removed.

This National Park Service list is complete through NPS recent listings posted September 25, 2026.

== Current listings ==
	Name on the Register	Image	Date listed	Location	City or town	Description
1	Adams County Courthouse	Adams County Courthouse	October 4, 2006 (#06000916)	22 S. 4th Ave. 39°59′11″N 104°49′02″W	Brighton	
2	Bowles House	Bowles House	November 3, 1988 (#88002308)	3924 W. 72nd Ave. 39°49′38″N 105°02′17″W	Westminster	
3	Brannan Sand and Gravel Pit No. 8-Lake Sangraco Boathouse Complex	Brannan Sand and Gravel Pit No. 8-Lake Sangraco Boathouse Complex	August 16, 2011 (#11000519)	Off Lowell Boulevard south of 62nd Ave. 39°48′22″N 105°01′56″W	Berkley	
4	Brighton High School	Brighton High School	January 23, 1998 (#97001665)	830 E. Bridge St. 39°59′09″N 104°48′40″W	Brighton	
5	Bromley Farm-Koizuma Hishinuma Farm	Bromley Farm-Koizuma Hishinuma Farm	August 16, 2007 (#07000811)	15820 E. 152nd Ave. 39°58′17″N 104°48′05″W	Brighton	
6	Colorado Sanitary Canning Factory	Colorado Sanitary Canning Factory	March 15, 2016 (#16000073)	224 N. Main St. 39°59′24″N 104°49′14″W	Brighton	
7	Deza Estates	Deza Estates	November 24, 2023 (#100009565)	W. 99th Ave, Lunceford Lane, Palmer Lane, Rapp Lane; 39°52′29″N 104°59′57″W	Northglenn	
8	Eastlake Farmers Co-Operative Elevator Company	Eastlake Farmers Co-Operative Elevator Company	May 17, 2010 (#10000259)	126th Ave and Claude Ct. 39°55′31″N 104°57′51″W	Thornton	
9	Engelbrecht Farm		December 10, 2014 (#14000170)	2024 Strasburg Rd. 39°44′47″N 104°19′20″W	Strasburg	
10	Granville Fuller House	Granville Fuller House	May 1, 2012 (#12000242)	2027 Galena St. 39°44′53″N 104°52′11″W	Aurora	
11	William J. Gregory House	William J. Gregory House	February 23, 1996 (#96000166)	8140 Lowell Boulevard; 39°50′40″N 105°02′01″W	Westminster	
12	Harris Park School	Harris Park School	August 30, 1990 (#90000868)	7200 Lowell Boulevard; 39°49′40″N 105°02′00″W	Westminster	
13	Metzger Farm	Metzger Farm	March 20, 2013 (#13000077)	12080 Lowell Blvd. 39°55′01″N 105°01′51″W	Westminster	
14	Riverside Cemetery	Riverside Cemetery	October 28, 1994 (#94001253)	5201 Brighton Boulevard; 39°47′39″N 104°57′33″W	Commerce City	Extends into Denver
15	M.J. Lavina Robidoux House	M.J. Lavina Robidoux House	September 15, 2011 (#11000655)	1615 Galena St. 39°44′32″N 104°52′11″W	Aurora	
16	St. Stephen's Lutheran Church	St. Stephen's Lutheran Church	July 12, 2019 (#100004209)	10828 Huron St. 39°53′34″N 104°59′48″W	Northglenn	
17	Thede Farmhouse	Thede Farmhouse	January 30, 1998 (#98000024)	3190 E. 112th Ave. 39°53′42″N 104°57′04″W	Northglenn	
18	Union High School	Union High School	January 14, 2000 (#99001665)	3455 W. 72nd Ave. 39°49′40″N 105°01′56″W	Westminster	
19	Westminster University	Westminster University	August 10, 1979 (#79000572)	3455 W. 83rd Ave. 39°50′50″N 105°01′53″W	Westminster	Red sandstone college building designed by E.B. Gregory and Stanford White. See also Westminster University
20	Blanche A. Wilson House	Blanche A. Wilson House	November 7, 1996 (#96001278)	1671 Galena St. 39°44′38″N 104°52′09″W	Aurora	

== Former listing ==
	Name on the Register	Image	Date listed	Date removed	Location	City or town	Description
1	David Wolpert House		June 27, 1975 (#75002141)	December 9, 1975	9190 River Dale Rd.	Thornton	Destroyed by fire in 1976

== See also ==
- List of National Historic Landmarks in Colorado
- List of National Register of Historic Places in Colorado
- Bibliography of Colorado
- Geography of Colorado
- History of Colorado
- Index of Colorado-related articles
- List of Colorado-related lists
- Outline of Colorado
