= Eastlake Farmers Co-Operative Elevator Company =

- U.S. National Register of Historic Places
- Colorado State Register of Historic Properties
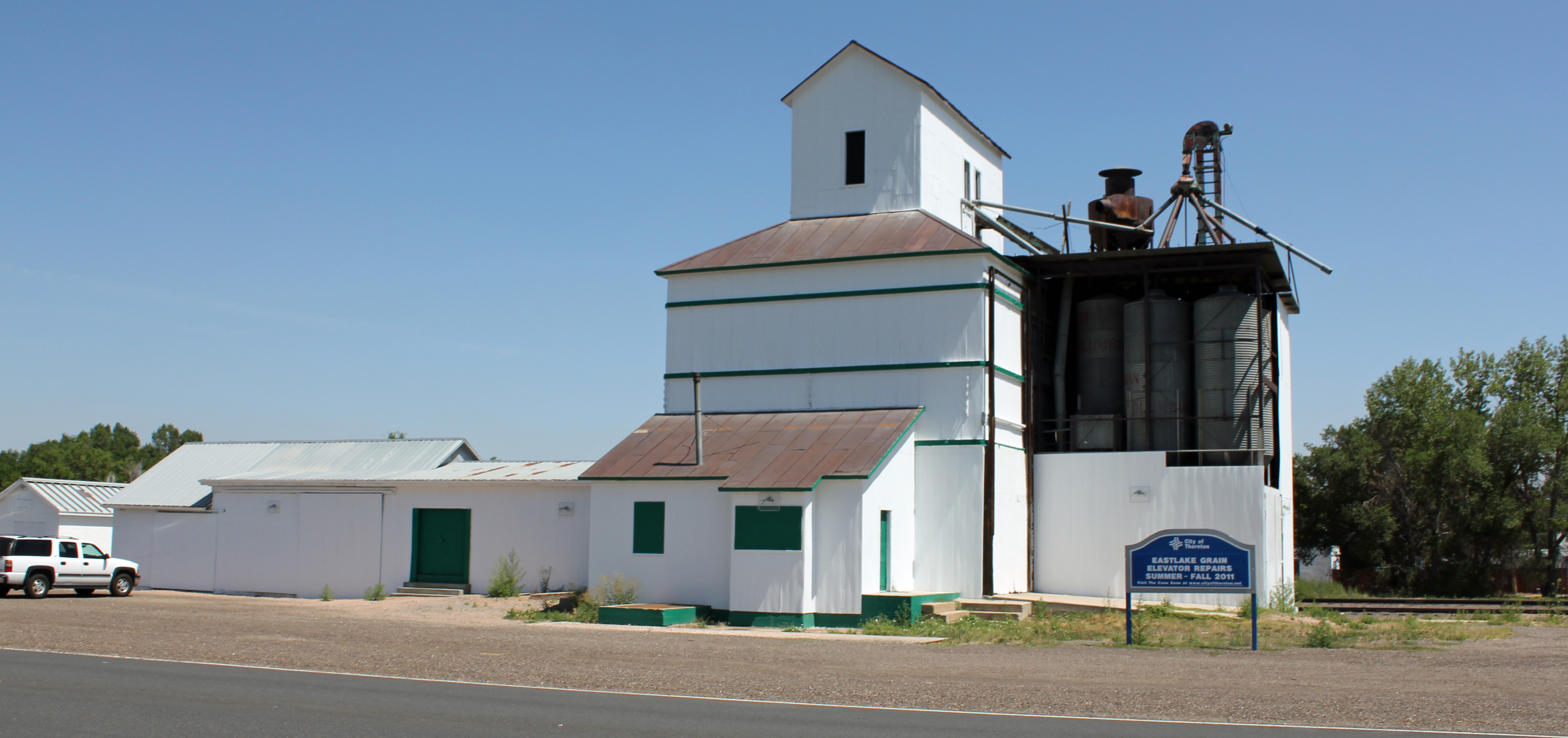

- Location within Colorado Location within the United States
- Location: 126 Ave. and Claude Ct., Thornton, Colorado
- Coordinates: 39.925278°N 104.964264°W
- Area: 1.2 acres (0.49 ha)
- Built: 1920
- NRHP reference No.: 10000259
- CSRHP No.: 5AM.1445
- Added to NRHP: May 17, 2010

The Eastlake Farmers Co-Operative Elevator Company is a grain elevator in Thornton, Colorado. The building was built in 1920, and is currently vacant. The elevator is an excellent example of a timber-frame, rural grain elevator that stands in stark contrast to the encroaching suburbs around the area.

The building is locally significant as an embodiment of High Plains architecture and reflects the transition between rail and truck transportation, as well as the shifts from single-grain to multiple-grain storage in rural Adams County, Colorado. It is also a fine example of the studded elevator construction technique, a response to the introduction of standardized lumber in the 20th century.

The property was listed on the National Register of Historic Places in 2010.

== See also ==
- National Register of Historic Place listings in Adams County, Colorado
