= Thede =

Thede can be a given name or a surname. Notable people with it include:

- Thede Kahl (born 1971), German ethnographer and ethnolinguist
- Thede Palm (1907–1995), Swedish historian of religion
- Phyllis Thede (born 1954), American politician
- Robin Thede (born 1979), American actress and comedian

== See also ==
- Thede Farmhouse, Northglenn, Colorado, United States
- Thiede
