= M.J. Lavina Robidoux House =

Historic house in Colorado, United States

- U.S. National Register of Historic Places
- Colorado State Register of Historic Properties
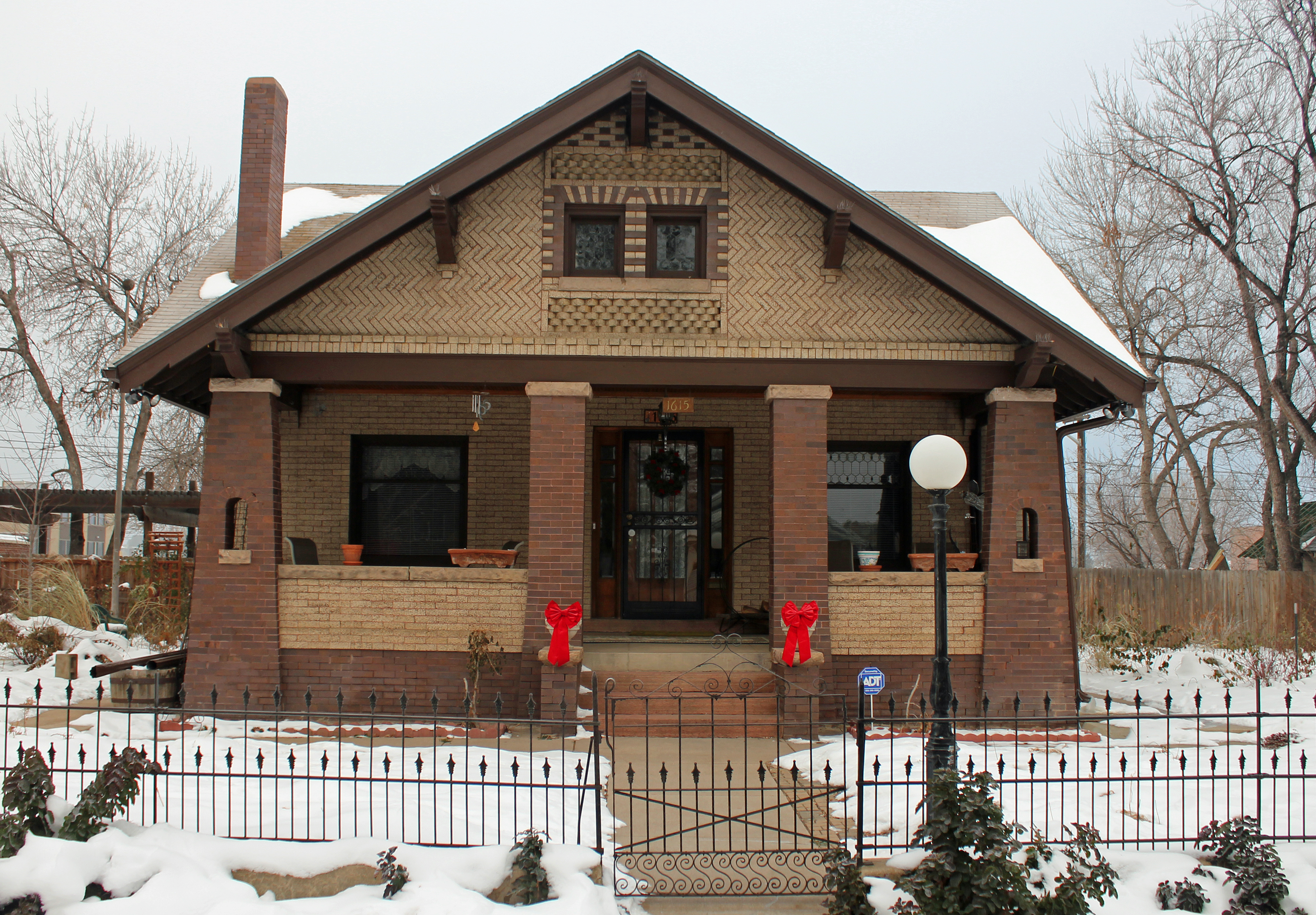
- Front of the house

- Location within Colorado Location within the United States
- Location: 1615 Galena St., Aurora, Colorado
- Coordinates: 39°44′32″N 104°52′11″W
- Built: 1913
- Architectural style: Late 19th & Early 20th Century American Movements/Bungalow/Craftsman
- NRHP reference No.: 110006558
- CSRHP No.: 5AM.344
- Added to NRHP: September 15, 2011

The M.J. Lavina Robidoux House (/ɛm d͡ʒeɪ lə.ˈvi.nə ɹoʊ.ˈbi.du haʊs/ em jay lə-VEE-nə-roh-BEE-doo) is a house located at 1615 Galena St. in Aurora, Colorado, United States. Built in 1913, it was listed on the National Register of Historic Places in 2011. The house is a one and a half story, cross-gabled, brick bungalow, and is one of the last surviving examples of the American craftsman architectural style in a brick bungalow in Aurora.

== History ==
Following the death of her husband Albert Robidoux, a wheat farmer and rancher, in 1912, Mary Jane Lavina Girard Robidoux moved to Aurora, Colorado, where she commissioned the construction of the house in 1913. She invested in the design and construction of a Craftsman-style brick bungalow. Robidoux died in her home in June 1929 and left the house to St. Clara's Orphanage.

St. Clara's Orphanage then sold the house to the Cornelius Muldoon family in 1930, who lived in the house until 1996.

When Clare Muldoon died in 1984, a family member moved in and inhabited the house until 1996, when it was sold to non-family members. In 2007, the current owners purchased the house and completed minor restoration of the wood floors and staircase.

Four families have lived at 1615 Galena Street.

== See also ==
- National Register of Historic Places listings in Adams County, Colorado
- Jacob Giretti McDonald on behalf of Aurora History Museum & Historic Sites. "Robidoux House ." Clio: Your Guide to History. June 18, 2020. Accessed December 14, 2025. https://theclio.com/entry/105528
