= Brannan Sand and Gravel Pit No. 8-Lake Sangraco Boathouse Complex =

- U.S. National Register of Historic Places
- Colorado State Register of Historic Properties
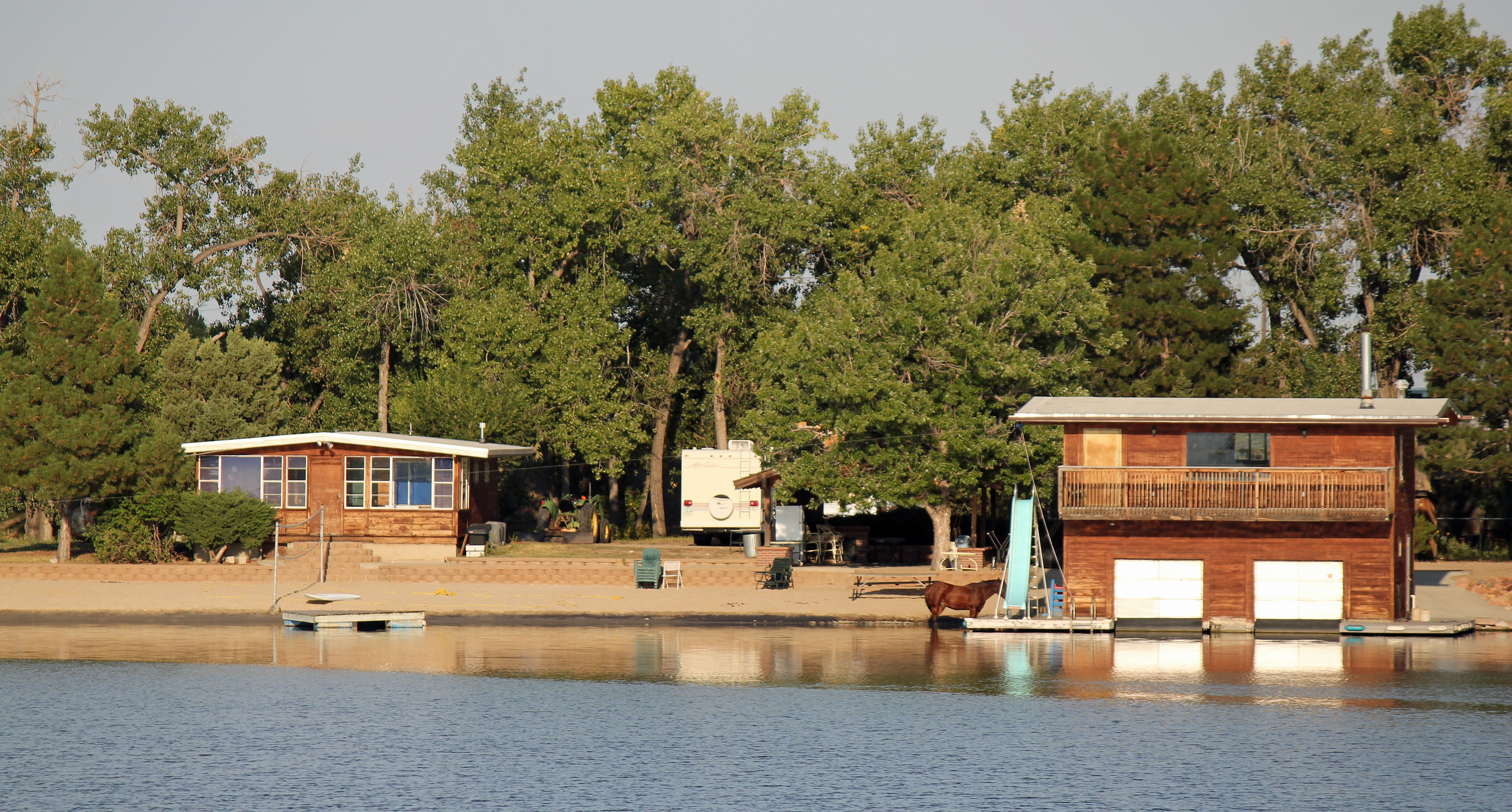

- Location within Colorado Location within the United States
- Location: Off Lowell Blvd. south of 62nd Ave, Denver, Colorado vicinity
- Coordinates: 39.806111°N 105.032222°W
- Built: 1945
- Architect: Lloyd S. Brannan
- Architectural style: Mid-century Modern
- NRHP reference No.: 11000519
- CSRHP No.: 5AM.2785
- Added to NRHP: August 16, 2011

The Brannan Sand and Gravel Pit No. 8-Lake Sangraco Boathouse Complex was a gravel and sand pit located in Adams County, Colorado that was converted to a private boating and recreational venue. Once the gravel pit dried up, Lloyd S. Brannan converted the pit to a lake, named Lake Sangraco, along with surrounding buildings being renovated for entertainment.

According to the listing, “ Lake Sangraco is significant in the area of Conservation and Reclamation as an outstanding model of the ability to convert and reclaim natural resources depleted by mining operations, exemplifying the ongoing functionality of mined resources. Additionally, the main buildings are good examples of the Mid-Century Modern style as adapted to recreational buildings“. The property was listed on the National Register of Historic Places in 2011.

== Architecture ==
The contributing buildings of the property are good examples of the Mid-Century Modern style and are characteristized by low-pitched gabled roofs, tripartite windows with casement sashes, picture windows, cedar tongue-and-groove siding, and wide overhanging boxed eaves.

== See also ==
- National Register of Historic Places listings in Adams County, Colorado
