= Bowles House (Westminster, Colorado) =

Historic house in Colorado, United States

- U.S. National Register of Historic Places
- Colorado State Register of Historic Properties
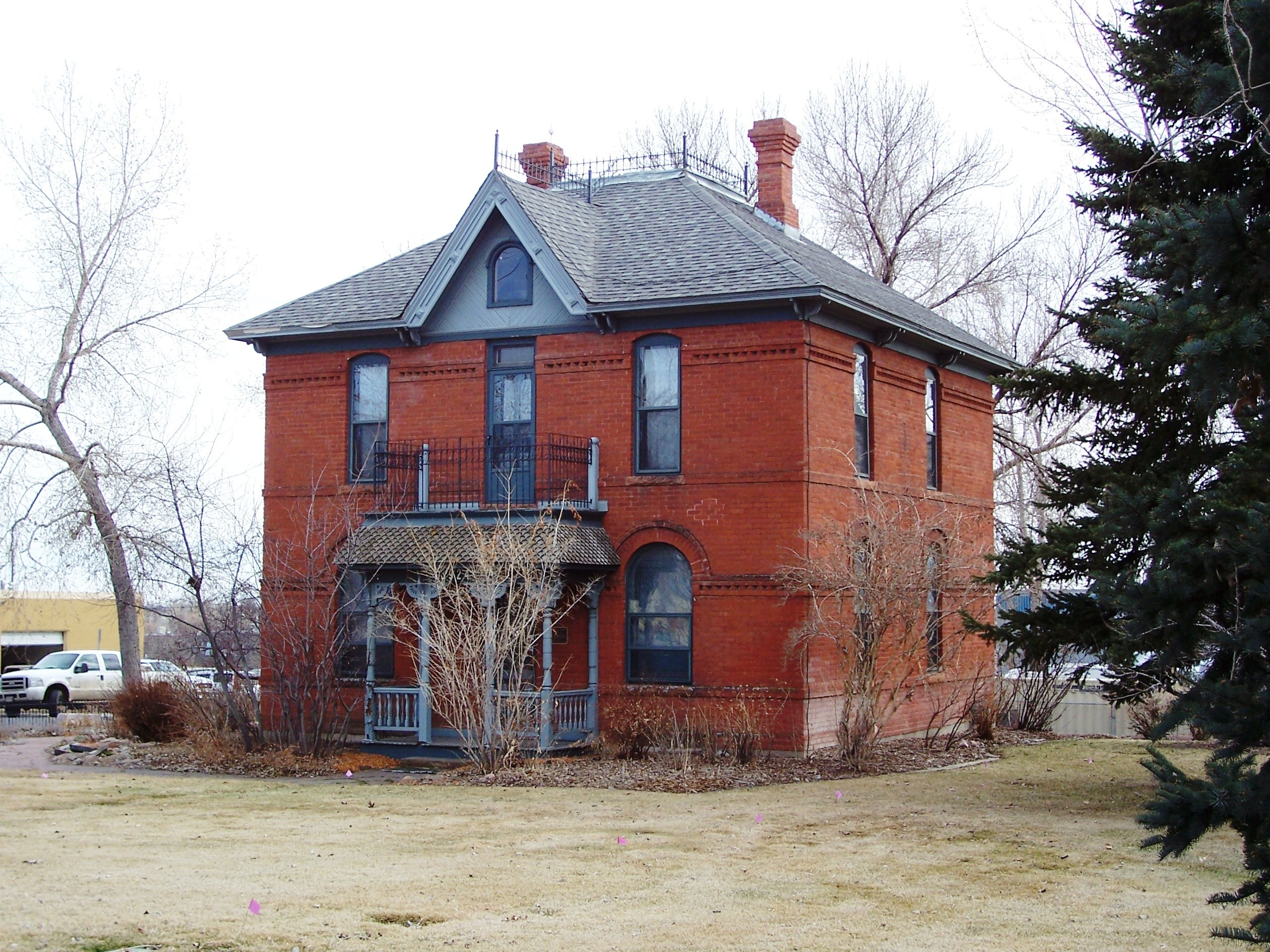
- Front of the house

- Location within Colorado Location within the United States
- Location: 3924 W. 72nd Ave., Westminster, Colorado
- Coordinates: 39°49′38″N 105°2′17″W
- Built: 1871
- Architectural style: Italianate
- NRHP reference No.: 88002308
- CSRHP No.: 5AM.64
- Added to NRHP: November 3, 1988

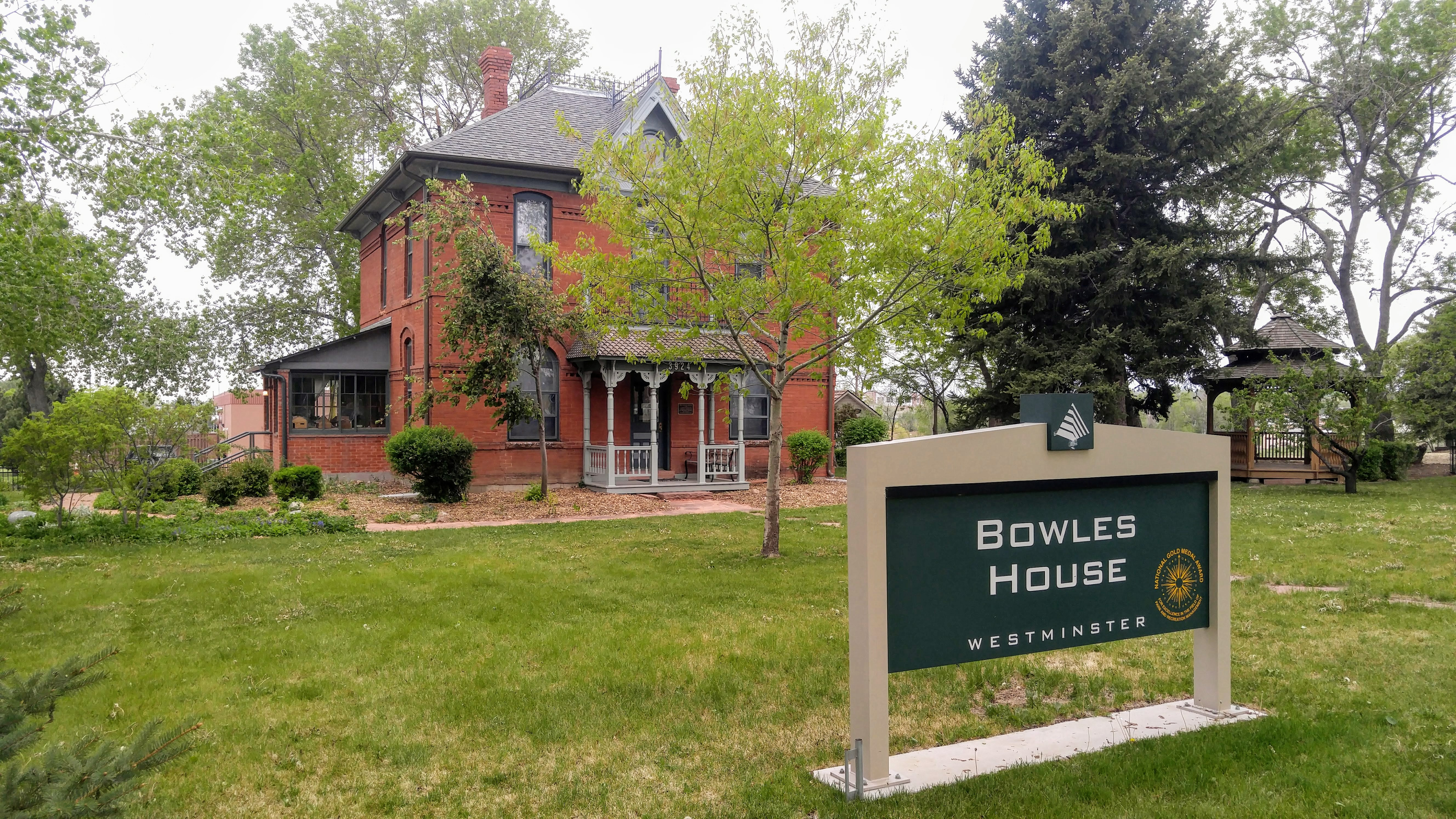

The Bowles House in Westminster, Colorado is a brick Italianate house built in 1871 by Edward Bruce Bowles and his wife Mahala Elizabeth Longan. Bowles is largely credited for bringing the Colorado & Southern Railroad to the present-day Westminster area.

Bowles came from Missouri to the Colorado Territory at age 17. In 1871, at about 24 years of age he married Mahala, and they homesteaded the land on which the house stands. Bowles was the second pioneer settler in the area, after Pleasant DeSpain who arrived in 1870 and whose farm was to the north of the Bowles House.

The Bowles House was originally constructed as a wood frame homestead cabin (no longer extant) but was rebuilt entirely from brick in 1876. The house was unusual for a rural ranch setting, as it included stylish and costly features: rounded windows, decorative brackets under the eaves, rooftop cresting, bargeboards on the gables, and an elaborate front porch.

It was listed on the National Register of Historic Places in 1988. The Bowles House was recognized as one of the earliest and most detailed examples of Italianate style in Westminster and as an icon of early Westminster settlement.

The house is owned by the City of Westminster and operated as a historic house museum by the Westminster Historical Society.

== See also ==
- National Register of Historic Places listings in Adams County, Colorado
