= Thiede =

Thiede is a surname. Notable people with the surname include:

- Carsten Peter Thiede (1952–2004), German archaeologist and New Testament scholar
- Fritz Thiede (1896–1981), German World War I flying ace
- Jörn Thiede (1941–2021), German palaeontologist and polar scientist
- Marco Thiede (born 1992), German footballer
- Niclas Thiede (born 1999), German footballer
- Norbert Thiede (born 1949), East German former Olympic discus thrower
- Oskar Thiede (1879–1961), Austrian sculptor
- Paula Thiede (1870–1919), German trade unions leader
- Peter Thiede (born 1968), German rowing cox
- Volkmar Thiede (born 1948), East German sprint canoeist
- Scott Thiede (born 1973), German DNR Warden

== See also ==
- Thede
