= Iver C. Ranum High School =

Coordinates: 39.842292°N 105.016738°W

Location
- 2401 W 80th Ave; Westminster, Colorado 80221; United States

Information
- Type: public secondary school
- Motto: Push to excel, prepare to succeed
- Established: 1961-2010
- School district: Adams County School District 50
- Principal: Mr. Evnas
- Grades: 9-12
- Campus size: 4+ acres
- Campus type: open
- Colors: Green, gold, and white
- Athletics: 4-A
- Mascot: Raider
- Website: http://westminsterpublicschools.org/ranum

Iver C. Ranum High School was a public secondary school operated by Adams County School District 50 near Westminster, Colorado, United States, from 1961 to 2010. The high school was located in the Sherrelwood neighborhood in Adams County. It was named in honor of Iver Ranum, Superintendent of Adams County School District 50 from 1950 to 1975. The last class of Ranum High School graduated on May 8, 2010. The high school has been replaced by the new Westminster High School.

The building that housed Iver C. Ranum High School currently houses Iver C. Ranum Middle School.

== Demographics ==
- Hispanic 63.1%
- White 27.5%
- African American 1.7%
- Asian 7.0%
- Native American 0.7%

58% of Ranum's students received free/reduced lunch.

== Outstanding alumni ==
- Frank DeAngelis (1970s), former principal of Columbine High School, known for his actions during and after the Columbine High School massacre in April 1999.
- Charles Pelkey (1976), former minority whip of the Wyoming House of Representatives. Pelkey represented House House District 45, Laramie, from 2015 to 2021. He served as Whip from 2017 to 2021.
- Chad Ashton (1986)

== Academic program ==
The school offered the International Baccalaureate program.

== See also ==
- Adams County School District 50
- List of high schools in Colorado
- State of Colorado
