= Thede Farmhouse =

Historic house in Colorado, United States

- U.S. National Register of Historic Places
- Colorado State Register of Historic Properties
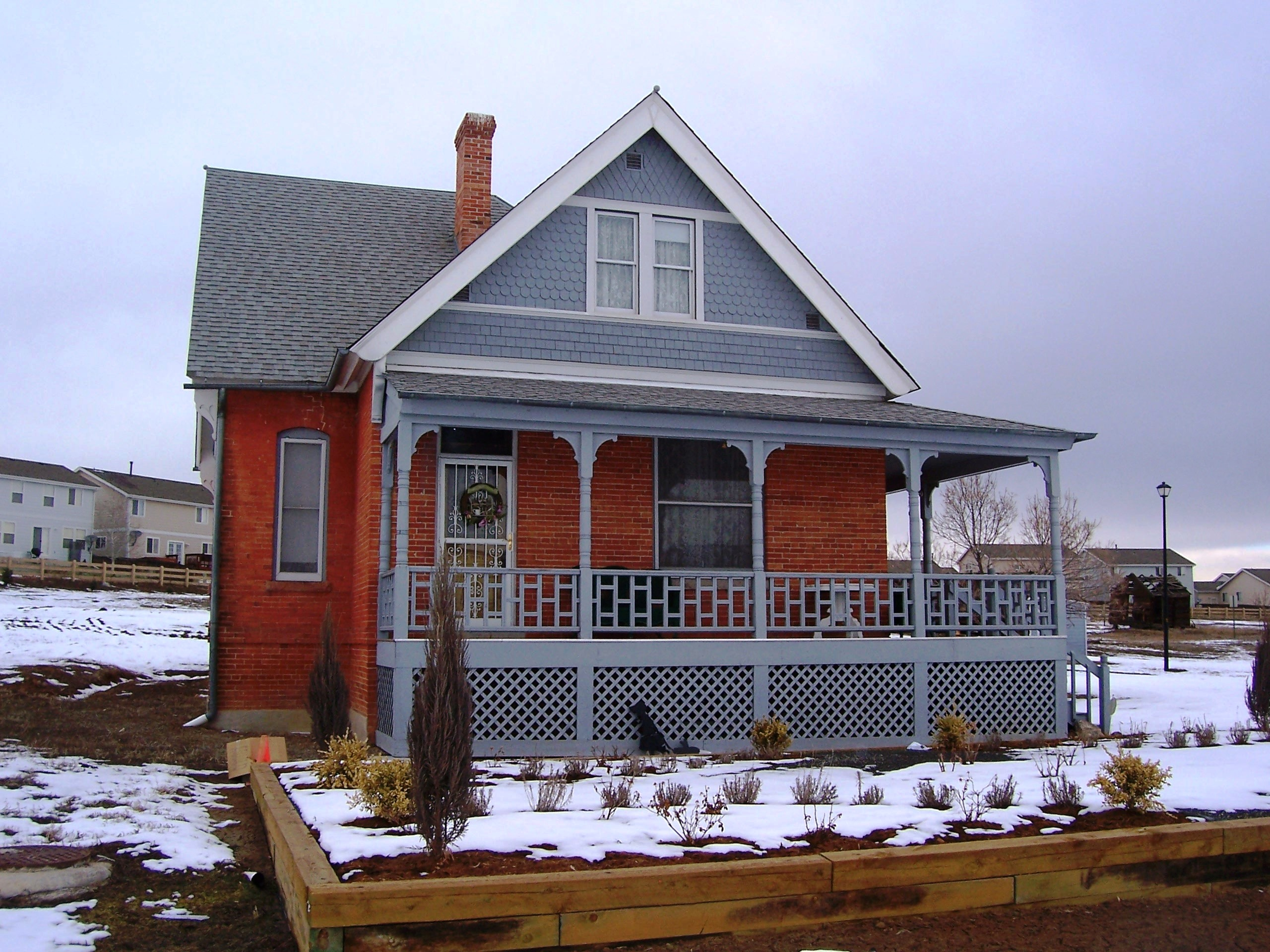
- 250px

- Location within Colorado Location within the United States
- Location: 3190 E. 112th Ave., Northglenn, Colorado
- Coordinates: 39°53′42″N 104°57′4″W
- Area: 11.2 acres (4.5 ha)
- Built: 1903
- Architectural style: Queen Anne
- NRHP reference No.: 98000024
- CSRHP No.: 5AM.1118
- Added to NRHP: January 30, 1998

The Thede Farmhouse is a historic farmhouse in Northglenn, Colorado, United States. Built in 1903, it is a Queen Anne house. Today, the brick farmhouse is surrounded by modern development. In 1998, the house was listed on the National Register of Historic Places because of its well-preserved architecture.

== See also ==
- National Register of Historic Places listings in Adams County, Colorado
