= Westminster Public Schools =

School district in Colorado, United States

Address
- 6933 Raleigh St. 2nd Floor Westminster, Colorado, 80030; United States
- Coordinates: 39°49′30″N 105°02′29″W

District information
- Established: 1946 (80 years ago)
- Superintendent: Pamela Swanson, Ed. D.
- NCES District ID: 0807230

Students and staff
- Enrollment: 8,373 (2020-2021)
- Staff: 504.29 (on an FTE basis)
- Student–teacher ratio: 16.60

Other information
- Website: www.westminsterpublicschools.org

Westminster Public Schools is a public school district located in extreme southwestern Adams County, Colorado, United States. The district serves the southeastern portion of the City of Westminster and adjacent areas. Originally known as Adams County School District No. 50, the name was changed in February 2016.

== Board of education ==
- President: Ken Ciancio
- Vice President: Max Math
- Secretary: Christine Martinez
- Treasurer: Aaron Martin
- Director: Dan Orecchio

== Schools ==
=== Early childhood ===
- Early Learning Center at F.M. Day (Infant - Preschool)
- Early Learning Center at Gregory Hill (Preschool)

=== Neighborhood schools ===
- Colorado Sports Leadership Academy
- Fairview PK-8
- Harris Park Elementary School
- Josephine Hodgkins Leadership Academy
- Mesa Elementary School
- Orchard Park Academy
- Sherrelwood Elementary School
- Sunset Ridge PK-8
- Tennyson Knolls Preparatory School

=== Online ===
- Westminster Virtual Academy

=== Innovation schools ===
- Colorado STEM Academy
- John E. Flynn A Marzano Academy
- Metropolitan Arts Academy
- Westminster Academy for International Studies

=== Middle schools ===
- Iver C. Ranum Middle School, Westminster, Colorado (transition to a middle school in 2010; 2021-22 was the last school year as a traditional middle school)
- On April 26, 2022, the WPS Board of Education authorized spending on an extensive renovation project at Ranum Middle School which will transform the historic building into a state-of-the-art multi-purpose campus offering expanded Career Technical Education (CTE) programs for students.

=== High schools ===
- Hidden Lake Secondary School (alternate secondary school) (6-12)
- Westminster High School
- Iver C. Ranum High School, Westminster, Colorado (opened in 1961 and closed in 2010; students were transferred to Westminster High School)
