= Don Fletcher (footballer) =

Australian rules footballer

Personal information
- Full name: Don Fletcher
- Born: 25 April 1958 (age 68)
- Original team: Kew Amateurs
- Height: 175 cm (5 ft 9 in)
- Weight: 76 kg (168 lb)

Playing career^{1}
Years	Club	Games (Goals)
1976–1977	Hawthorn	7 (2)
- ^{1} Playing statistics correct to the end of 1977.

Don Fletcher (born 25 April 1958) is a former Australian rules footballer who played with Hawthorn in the Victorian Football League (VFL).
