= Westminster High School (Colorado) =

Location
- 6933 Raleigh St; Westminster, Colorado 80030; United States
- Coordinates: 39°49′19″N 105°02′24″W

Information
- Type: Public secondary school
- Motto: Where Education is Personal
- Established: 1949 (77 years ago)
- School district: Westminster Public Schools
- CEEB code: 061440
- Principal: Maureen Bangsund
- Teaching staff: 95.65 (FTE)
- Grades: 9-12
- Student to teacher ratio: 21.02
- Colors: Black and teal
- Mascot: Wolves
- Website: http://whs.westminsterpublicschools.org/

Westminster High School is a public secondary school (grades 9-12) operated by Westminster Public Schools in Westminster, Adams County, Colorado, United States.

The campus is on almost the same lot as the original building. Features include three multi-purpose basketball courts, an indoor track, a lecture hall, and a 725-seat theater, all within a 375,000-square-foot (34,800 m^{2}) building. The school also features the Future Center, a portion of its library dedicated to teaching students about various career opportunities, post-secondary education, and concurrent enrollment in college level programs.

== History ==
At the end of 1996, it was announced that all incoming freshmen in the '08-'09 school year, as well as all sophomores in the district who currently attended either Ranum or Westminster High School, would be attending the current Westminster High School campus until the new building was finished, for the '10-'11 school year. The district then announced the new school name would also be Westminster High School and the new school colors would be teal, black, and silver, with the wolves as a mascot.

The original Westminster High School was located at 7300 Lowell, which later became the Career Enrichment Park when Westminster High School moved from 73rd and Lowell to its current location in 1976. When originally established in 1949, the school colors were blue and white, and the mascot was a Warrior.

== Demographics ==
- Hispanic 62.2%
- White 5.2%
- African American 1.8%
- Asian 8.7%
- Native American 1.1%

== See also ==
- Adams County School District 50
- List of high schools in Colorado
