= Gregory House (Poughkeepsie, New York) =

Historic house in New York, United States

- U.S. National Register of Historic Places
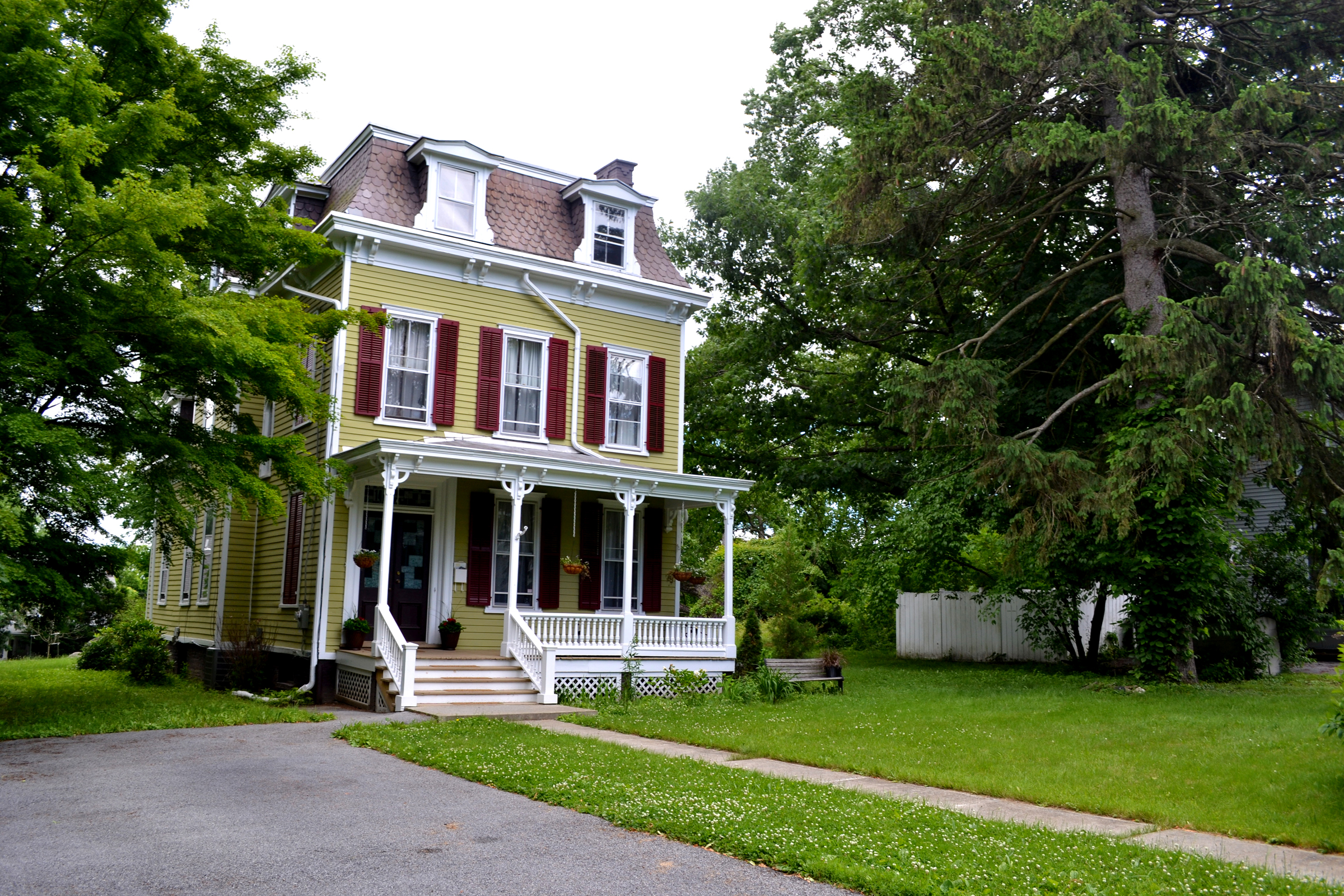
- The house in June 2013.

- Location within New York Location within the United States
- Location: 140 S. Cherry St., Poughkeepsie, New York
- Coordinates: 41°41′45″N 73°55′5″W
- Area: less than one acre
- Built: c. 1869
- Architectural style: Second Empire
- MPS: Poughkeepsie MRA
- NRHP reference No.: 82001140
- Added to NRHP: November 26, 1982

Gregory House, is a historic home located at 140 South Cherry Street in Poughkeepsie, Dutchess County, New York. It was built about 1869, is a 2 1/2-story, Second Empire-style dwelling. It features a bellcast mansard roof.

On November 26, 1982, it was added to the National Register of Historic Places.
