= Richard and Mary Alice Frank House =

Historic house in California, United States

- U.S. National Register of Historic Places
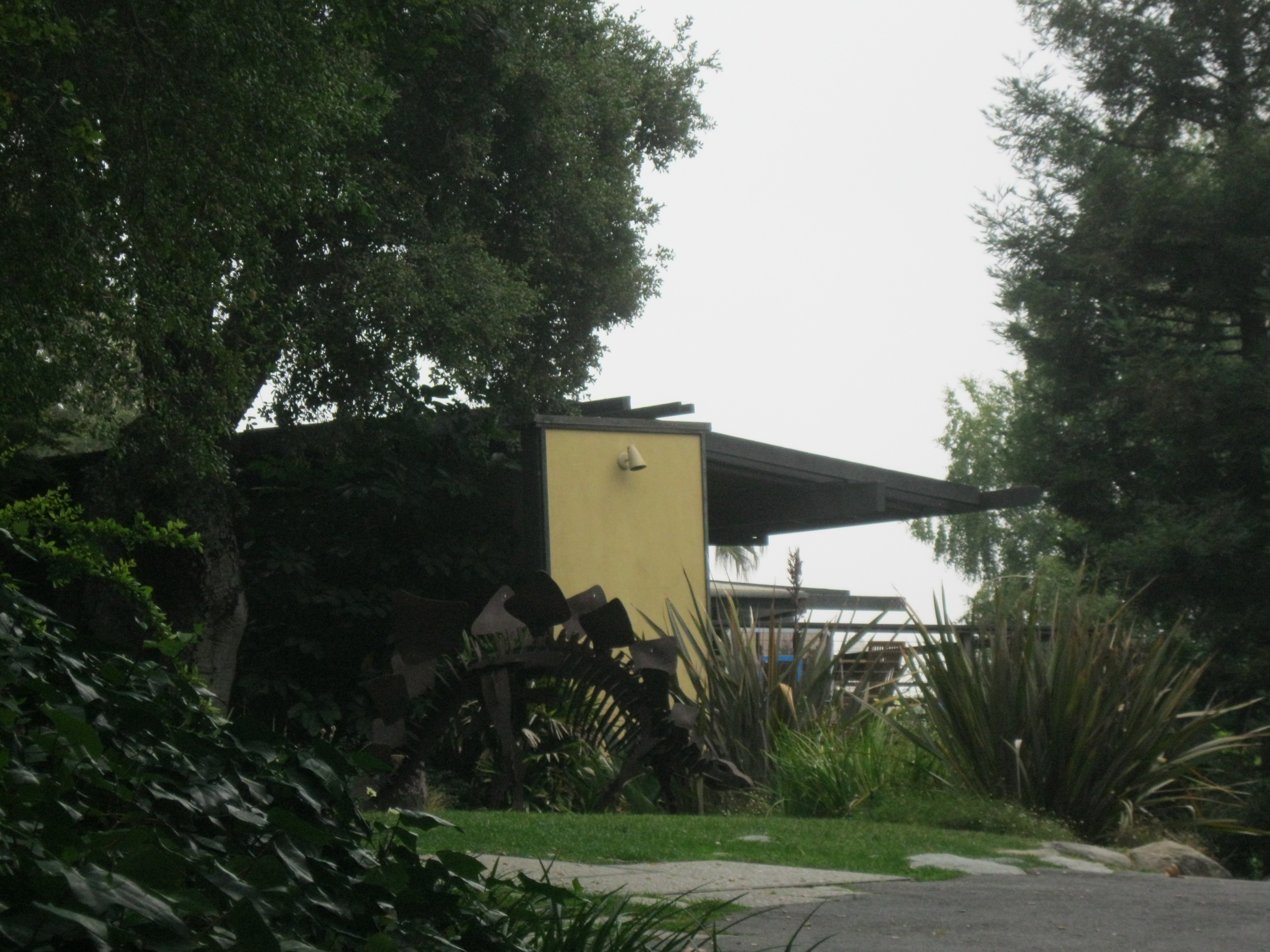

- Location within the Los Angeles metropolitan area Location within California Location within the United States
- Location: 919 La Loma Rd., Pasadena, California
- Coordinates: 34°8′3″N 118°10′8″W
- Area: 1.1 acres (0.45 ha)
- Built: 1957
- Architect: Buff, Straub & Hensman
- Architectural style: Modern Movement
- MPS: Cultural Resources of the Recent Past, City of Pasadena
- NRHP reference No.: 09000175
- Added to NRHP: April 10, 2009

The Richard and Mary Alice Frank House is a historic house located at 919 La Loma Road in Pasadena, California. Built in 1957, the house was designed by Buff, Straub, and Hensman. The stucco and wood home has a Modernist design influenced by American Craftsman and Japanese architecture. The home's design features gently sloped roofs with tongue-and-groove overhangs, an exterior with wide glass panels interspersed with thin wood and stucco sections, and exposed wooden framing.

The house was added to the National Register of Historic Places on April 10, 2009.
