= Don Fletcher (ice hockey) =

Canadian ice hockey player (1931–2022)

- Born: March 28, 1931 Calgary, Alberta, Canada
- Died: February 8, 2022 (aged 90) Nelson, British Columbia, Canada
- Height: 6 ft 2 in (188 cm)
- Weight: 197 lb (89 kg; 14 st 1 lb)
- Position: Defense
- Shot: Right
- Played for: Trail Smoke Eaters
- National team: Canada
- Playing career: 1951–1965
Medal record
Men's ice hockey
Gold medal – first place	1961 Switzerland	Ice hockey

Donald Edward Fletcher (March 28, 1931 – February 8, 2022) was a Canadian ice hockey player with the Trail Smoke Eaters. He won a gold medal at the 1961 World Ice Hockey Championships in Switzerland. Fletcher also played for the Regina Caps, Moose Jaw Canucks, Springfield Indians, Moose Jaw Millers, Rossland Warriors, and Seattle Totems. He was part of the Canadian team that won the 1961 World Ice Hockey Championships in Switzerland. Fletcher died in Nelson, British Columbia on February 8, 2022, at the age of 90.
