= Richard and Mary Woodward Gregory House =

- U.S. National Register of Historic Places
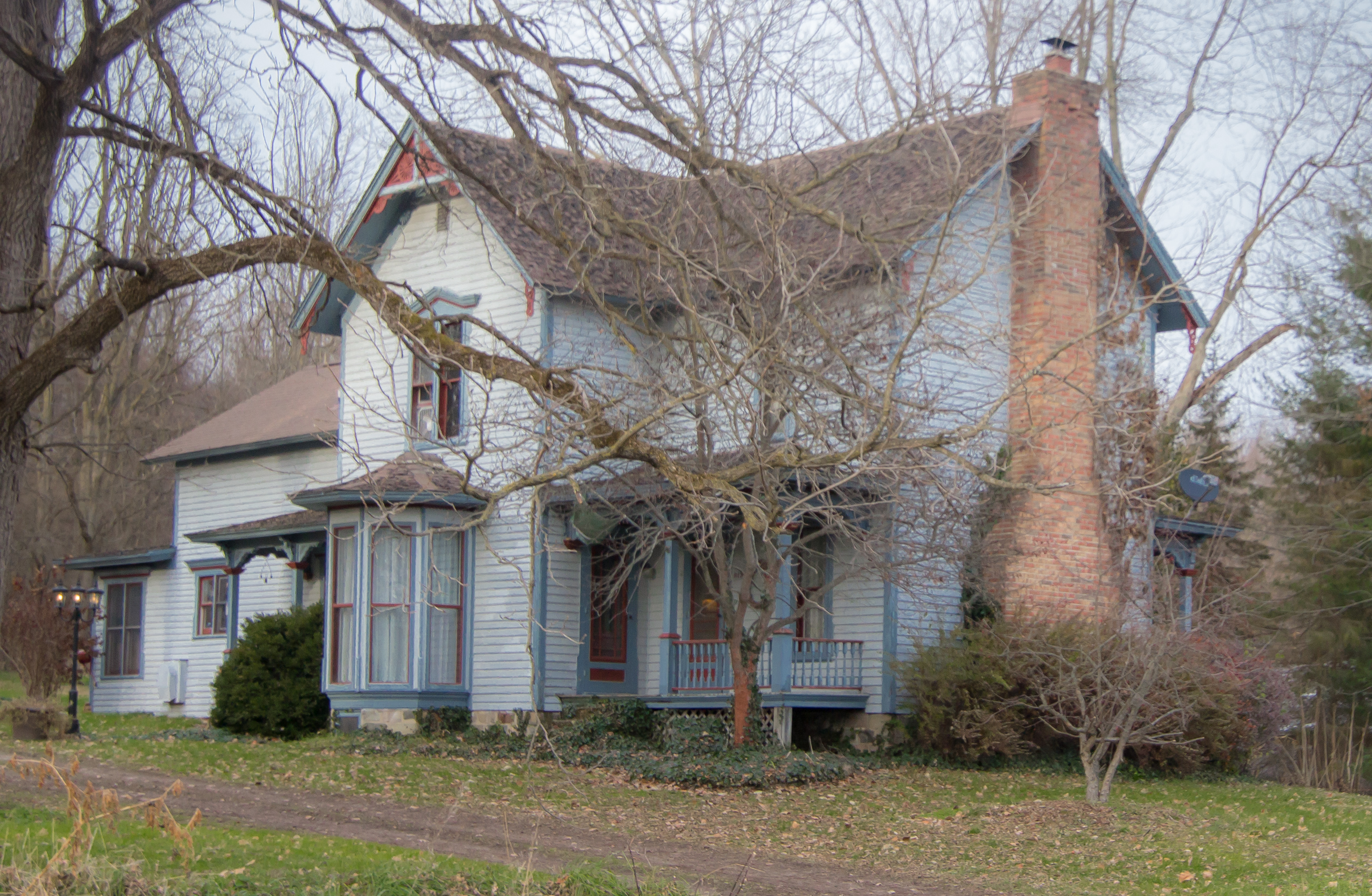

- Location within Michigan Location within the United States
- Interactive map
- Location: 913 E. Augusta Rd., Augusta, Michigan
- Coordinates: 42°20′35″N 85°20′38″W
- Area: 3 acres (1.2 ha)
- Built: c. 1880
- Architectural style: Eastlake
- NRHP reference No.: 02000666
- Added to NRHP: June 20, 2002

The Richard and Mary Woodward Gregory House is a single-family home located at 913 East Augusta Road in Augusta, Michigan. It was listed on the National Register of Historic Places in 2002.

== History ==
Richard D. Gregory arrived in Augusta in 1864. Shortly thereafter, he married a local schoolteacher, Mary C. Woodward. In 1865, the couple purchased the 120 acres on which this house is located from Seth Pratt. They constructed a house on the land some time around 1870; however, this was likely an earlier house and not the present one. The Gregorys farmed the land, adding more acreage in the 1870s. They also became involved in the local community, with Richard serving as a village trustee and highway commissioner and Mary a board member of the Augusta Ladies Library Association. The present house was likely built in about 1880.

Mary Gregory died in 1891; the couple had no children. Richard remarried the following year, to Mary Gott, whose family owned a neighboring farm. The couple had a daughter, Lillian, in 1894, but by 1900 Richard was living in the Kalamazoo Asylum. He died in 1903. In 1904, Mary remarried, to George Godde, and in 1906 Lillian Gregory had officially inherited the estate. Mary and George Godde continued farming, and had eight children. In 1924, George Godde died in a lightning strike. Mary continued farming; in 1931, Lillian, having married and moved, deeded the farm to Mary. Mary Godde died in 1947, and in 1949 the farm was sold to William Alonzo and Eugenie Ethel Sibole of Benton Harbor, Michigan. Eugenie died in 1954, and the farm was sold again.

== Description ==
The Gregory House is a two-story, cross gable, nearly symmetrical Eastlake house. It is wood framed, and sits on a cut stone block foundation. The walls are covered with wooden weatherboard, with trim outlining the windows. Five-sided bay windows are centered on the side facades. Other windows in the house are one-over-one double-hung units with double rows of saw-tooth trim just above. Some second floor windows are paired, with gabled caps of classical decoration. Some of the single windows on the porches and on the second floor have flat classical caps. The front facade, facing the road, has a central chimney. A 1 1/2-story gabled wing projects to the rear.

The house has four matching porches with cutwork trim, which give the house a distinctive appearance. The porches are identical, and are located in the four angles formed by the intersection of the wings. The porches have low-pitched hipped roofs supported by corner brackets on square chamfered-edge columns. Between supports is a turned spindle balustrade. Other decorative elements include pinwheel patterns on the gables and sawtooth trim on gables edges.
