= Donald Fletcher =

American businessman (1849–1929)

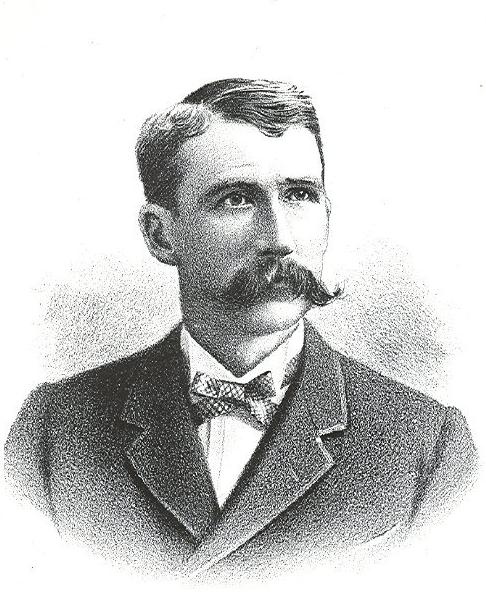
Donald Fletcher, c.1890

Donald George Fletcher (September 29, 1849 – January 2, 1929) was an American real estate tycoon in Colorado in the late 19th century.

== Early life and education ==
Fletcher was born in Cobourg, Ontario, Canada. His family moved to Chicago when he was a child. He later attended New York University, Knox College, and Union Seminary, training as a Presbyterian minister.

== Career ==
In 1879, at the age of 30, he moved to Colorado for health reasons, most likely to find relief from tuberculosis. He went on to become wealthy in the real estate business in Denver.

In 1890 he allegedly co-founded a town called Fletcher on the plains east of Denver around Colfax Avenue with partners Thomas Hayden and Charles Dickenson. When the 1893 Silver Crash came, Fletcher lost his fortune and moved to Cripple Creek, Colorado, selling his shares in Fletcher to Hayden and Dickenson in October 1893, leaving Fletcher residents with bond payments for non-existent water. Without a stable source of water, the town of Fletcher nearly met its demise, and the owners petitioned Denver for annexation in vain.

However, the town endured, and was renamed Aurora in 1907 by a vote of the town citizens.

== Death and legacy ==
Fletcher died in San Leandro, California on January 2, 1929, at the age of 79.

The town site of Fletcher is now known as the "Original Aurora", the northwest corner of Colorado's third-largest city. Today a square in the heart of Original Aurora is named "Fletcher Plaza", and includes a sunken garden and tree-lined sitting area.

The Donald Fletcher House at 1575 Grant Street in Denver, Colorado, was torn down in the 1960s to make way for an office building that was never built. The former art gallery is all that remains.
