= Westminster, Colorado =

Home rule city in Adams and Jefferson counties, Colorado, United States

- Home rule city
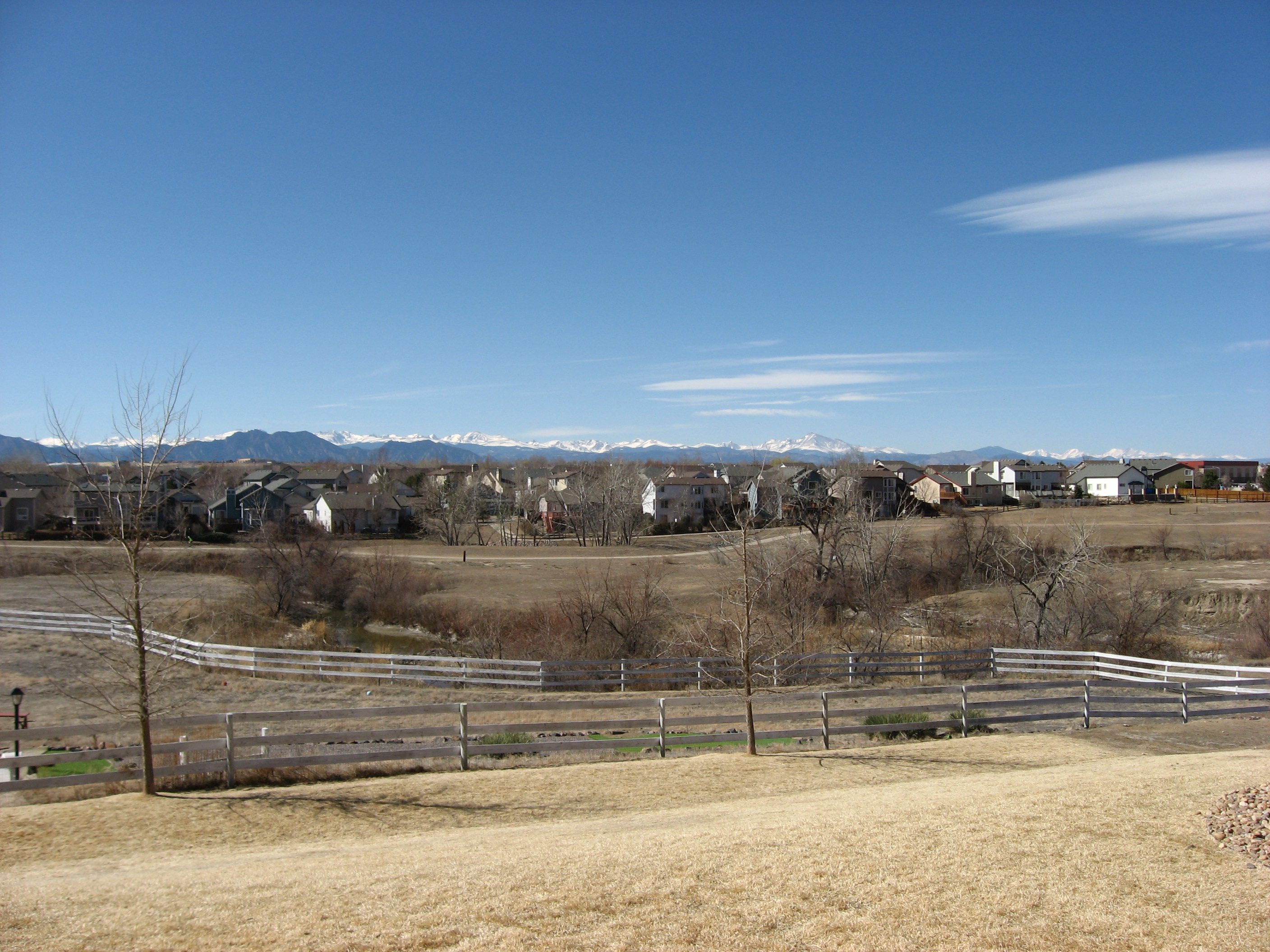
- Houses in Westminster with the Front Range in the background

- Flag
- Interactive map of Westminster, Colorado
- Location within Colorado Location within the United States
- Coordinates: 39°53′01″N 105°03′45″W
- Country: United States
- State: Colorado
- Counties: Adams and Jefferson
- Settled: 1870
- Platted: 1885 as DeSpain Junction, later Harris
- Incorporated: April 4, 1911, as the Town of Westminster

Government
  - Type: Home rule city

Area
  - Home rule city: 33.898 sq mi (87.796 km^{2})
  - Land: 31.585 sq mi (81.806 km^{2})
  - Water: 2.313 sq mi (5.990 km^{2})
- Elevation: 5,325 ft (1,623 m)

Population (2020)
  - Home rule city: 116,317
  - Rank: 8th in Colorado; 250th in the United States
  - Density: 3,683/sq mi (1,422/km^{2})
  - Metro: 2,963,821 (19th)
  - CSA: 3,623,560 (17th)
  - Front Range: 5,055,344
- Time zone: UTC−07:00 (MST)
  - Summer (DST): UTC−06:00 (MDT)
- ZIP codes: 80003, 80005, 80020-80021, 80023, 80030-80031, 80035-80036, 80221, 80234, 80241, 80260
- Area codes: 303/720/983
- GNIS city ID: 2412237
- FIPS code: 08-83835
- Website: www.westminsterco.gov

Westminster is a home rule city in Adams and Jefferson counties, Colorado, United States. The population was 116,317 at the 2020 census, with 71,240 residing in Adams County and 45,077 residing in Jefferson County. Westminster is the eighth-most populous city in Colorado. The city is a part of the Denver metropolitan area and the Front Range Urban Corridor. The Westminster Municipal Center is located 9 miles (14 km) north-northwest of the Colorado State Capitol in Denver.

== History ==
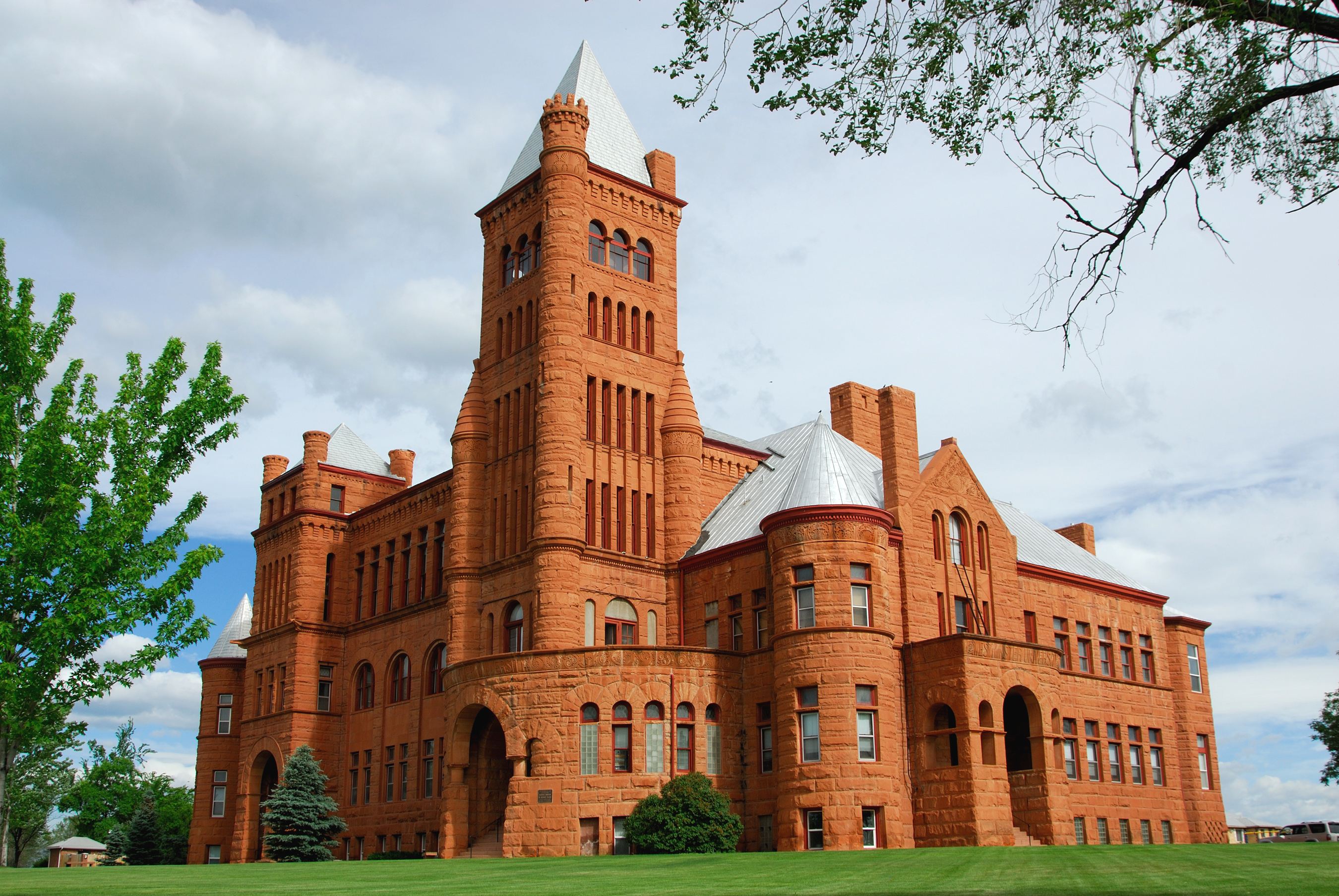
Westminster University, also known as Westminster Castle, is listed on the National Register of Historic Places and overlooks the city of Denver.

Gold discovered in the South Platte River Valley in 1858 brought national attention to the area that would become Westminster, Colorado. The promise of fortune and The Homestead Act of 1862 encouraged many pioneers from the east to settle in Colorado rather than continue on to California. Before the settlements came, wildlife like antelope and buffalo made their homes in the area. There is also evidence of Arapaho Indians near the Crown Point (Gregory Hill) area.

Westminster's first permanent settler was Kentucky farmer Pleasant DeSpain, who built his home in 1870 on 160 acres (near what is now West 76th Avenue and Lowell Street). The area became known as DeSpain Junction and attracted other settlers including Edward Bruce Bowles, who in 1881 constructed a brick Italianate house now known as the Bowles House. It was listed on the National Register of Historic Places in 1988. The village of DeSpain Junction grew into a small farming community and continued to attract new settlers despite the difficulty of farming in Colorado's arid climate.

Connecticut real estate developer C.J. Harris arrived in DeSpain Junction in 1885 and purchased the DeSpain farm, among others. Harris combined the separate homesteads and divided it into smaller tracts of land, which he sold to fruit farmers. Harris renamed DeSpain Junction with his own name and the area was referred to as Harris, Colorado. The Harris, Colorado, post office opened on June 5, 1908, although much of the area of future city was served by the Denver, Colorado, post office.

In 1890, New Yorker Henry T. Mayham convinced the Denver Presbytery to build a university on land that he owned in Harris. After delays caused by the depression of 1893, the school was built from red sandstone quarried in Colorado's Red Rocks region. The curriculum was patterned after Princeton University and was referred to as the "Princeton of the West". The school was incorporated as Westminster University of Colorado, and classes began in 1908 with one year's tuition costing $50 ($1,411 in 2018). The Harris post office was renamed Westminster on June 5, 1908, and the Town of Westminster was incorporated on May 24, 1911. The school ceased operating in 1917, when all students in attendance left to fight in World War I. In the following decade it operated as a church and school. The former Westminster University is now on the National Register of Historic Places.

In July 2006, Westminster was ranked as the 24th best place to live in the US by Money magazine.

=== Bell Tower ===
Westminster City Hall features a 14-story bell tower topped by a pyramid shaped steel mesh structure. The 130-foot spire, which is widely known and referenced as a community landmark, was first conceptualized as a symbolic tie and tribute to the clock tower of Westminster Palace in England known as Big Ben. The unveiling of the Bell Tower in 1986 was attended by the then mayor of Westminster, London. An English oak can be seen on the City Hall property today- a gift to Westminster, Colorado, from London.

== Geography ==
Westminster is located in western Adams County and northeastern Jefferson County. It is bordered to the north by Broomfield, to the northeast by Thornton, to the east by Northglenn and Federal Heights, to the southeast by Sherrelwood, Twin Lakes and Berkley, and to the south by Arvada.

At the 2020 United States census, the town had a total area of 21,695 acres (87.796 km^{2}) including 1,480 acres (5.990 km^{2}) of water.

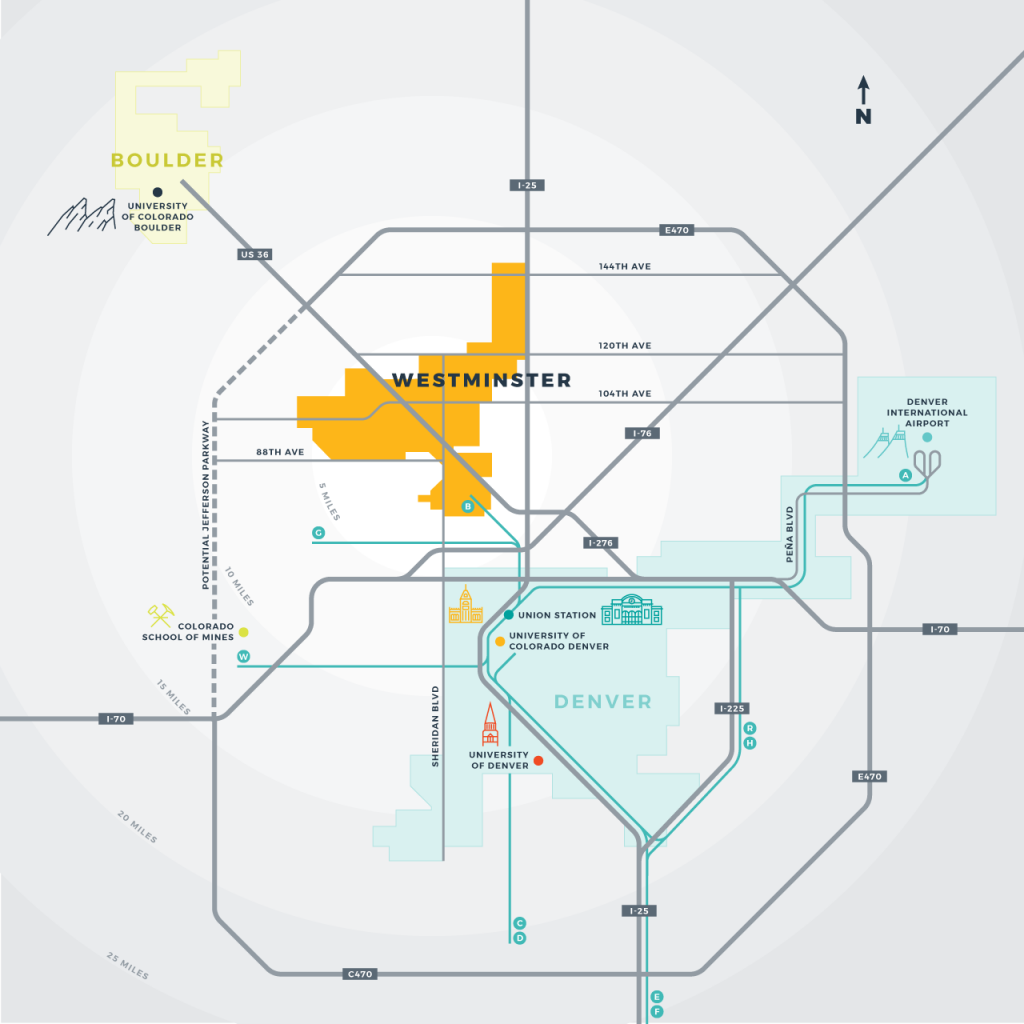

== Demographics ==
Historical population
Census	Pop.	Note	%±
1920	235		—
1930	436		85.5%
1940	534		22.5%
1950	1,686		215.7%
1960	13,850		721.5%
1970	19,512		40.9%
1980	50,211		157.3%
1990	74,625		48.6%
2000	100,940		35.3%
2010	106,114		5.1%
2020	116,317		9.6%
2024 (est.)	115,302	▼	−0.9%
U.S. Decennial Census

=== 2020 census ===
Westminster, Colorado – racial and ethnic composition Note: the US Census treats Hispanic/Latino as an ethnic category. This table excludes Latinos from the racial categories and assigns them to a separate category. Hispanics/Latinos may be of any race.
Race / ethnicity (NH = Non-Hispanic)	Pop 2000	Pop 2010	Pop 2020	% 2000	% 2010	% 2020
White alone (NH)	76,637	74,447	74,502	75.92%	70.16%	64.05%
Black or African American alone (NH)	1,149	1,360	1,805	1.14%	1.28%	1.55%
Native American or Alaska Native alone (NH)	466	470	576	0.46%	0.44%	0.50%
Asian alone (NH)	5,479	5,650	6,372	5.43%	5.32%	5.48%
Pacific Islander alone (NH)	53	82	80	0.05%	0.08%	0.07%
Some Other Race alone (NH)	71	175	503	0.07%	0.16%	0.43%
Mixed race or multi-racial (NH)	1,716	1,924	5,241	1.70%	1.81%	4.51%
Hispanic or Latino (any race)	15,369	22,006	27,238	15.23%	20.74%	23.42%
Total	100,940	106,114	116,317	100.00%	100.00%	100.00%

As of the census of 2000, there were 100,940 people, 38,343 households, and 26,034 families residing in the city. The population density was 3,203.9 inhabitants per square mile (1,237.0/km^{2}). There were 39,318 housing units at an average density of 1,248.0 units per square mile (481.9 units/km^{2}). The racial makeup of the city was 84.19% White, 1.23% African American, 0.74% Native American, 5.48% Asian, 0.08% Pacific Islander, 5.52% from other races, and 2.76% from two or more races. Hispanic or Latino people of any race were 15.23% of the population.

There were 38,343 households, out of which 35.7% had children under the age of 18 living with them, 53.6% were married couples living together, 9.6% had a female householder with no husband present, and 32.1% were non-families. 23.7% of all households were made up of individuals, and 4.5% had someone living alone who was 65 years of age or older. The average household size was 2.62 and the average family size was 3.15.

In the city, the population was spread out, with 26.9% under the age of 18, 9.6% from 18 to 24, 36.0% from 25 to 44, 21.0% from 45 to 64, and 6.5% who were 65 years of age or older. The median age was 33 years. For every 100 females, there were 100.2 males. For every 100 females age 18 and over, there were 98.9 males.

The median income for a household in the city was $56,323, and the median income for a family was $63,776. Males had a median income of $41,539 versus $31,568 for females. The per capita income for the city was $25,482. About 3.1% of families and 4.7% of the population were below the poverty line, including 5.1% of those under age 18 and 6.3% of those age 65 or over.

== Transportation ==
Westminster is intersected by several state highways: I-25, US 36, US 287, SH 95, SH 121, and SH 128.

The Denver Regional Transportation District (RTD) provides bus service to Westminster connecting it to Boulder and Denver via Flatiron Flyer, a bus rapid transit service that travels in the US 36 express lanes.

The Westminster Center park-n-Ride operated by the RTD is located on both sides of U.S. 36 and is immediately across Sheridan Boulevard from the site. Approximately 1,546 people per weekday board at this facility, with approximately 498 buses per day serving this park-n-Ride.

RTD opened the B Line to the public in 2016 which brings commuter rail service between downtown Denver and Westminster Station. The 6 miles of commuter rail transports riders from the historic center of Westminster to the dynamic Union Station Transit Center where they can connect to the C/D, E, and W light rail lines, the A Line to Denver International Airport, as well as Local and Regional buses, and the FreeMallRide and FreeMetroRide downtown shuttles.

Westminster is served by Denver International Airport and nearby Rocky Mountain Metropolitan Airport.

== Economy ==
Companies based in Westminster include Vantor, Ball and the Western Fuels Association.

=== Top employers ===
Westminster's top employers represent leading companies in high-tech, medical, energy, and other expanding fields. As of 2019 the top ten primary employers in Westminster, ranked by number of employees, included:

Rank	Employer	# of employees
1	Ball Corporation	1,252
2	Vantor	1,071
3	St. Anthony's North Hospital	1,015
4	Trimble Navigation	733
5	Alliance Data Systems	677
6	Tri-State Generation and Transmission Association	541
7	MTech Mechanical Technologies Group	600
8	ReedGroup	496
9	Epsilon	454
10	CACI International	407

== Education ==
High schools in or near Westminster include the Academy of Charter Schools, Hidden Lake High School, Jefferson Academy High School, Legacy High School, Mountain Range High School, Northglenn High School, Pomona High School, Standley Lake High School, and Westminster High School. In 2010, Adams County School District 50 opened a new Westminster High School, replacing both the existing Westminster High School and Ranum High School, which graduated its last class that year.

Shepherd of the Valley Lutheran School is a pre-k3 through 8th grade Christian school of the Wisconsin Evangelical Lutheran Synod in Westminster.

== Open space ==
Westminster has an extensive trail network and open space system. The highlight of the trail system is the Big Dry Creek Trail, which extends approximately 12 miles (19 km) from the eastern boundary of the city to Standley Lake. Other trails parallel the Farmers' High Line Canal, Walnut Creek, and Little Dry Creek.

Westminster began preserving open spaces in 1985, when voters first approved a sales tax specifically earmarked to acquire and maintain open space. The city now owns more than 3,000 acres in all parts of Westminster. The city has preserved large expanses of land in the Standley Lake Regional Park and the Westminster Hills area, among others. Westminster City Park, City Park Recreation Center, and many other neighborhood and community parks provide various recreation facilities. Westminster has several golf courses, including Legacy Ridge Golf Course, the Heritage Golf Course at Westmoor, Walnut Creek Golf Course and the Hyland Hills golf course.

Downtown Westminster intersects directly with the new U.S. 36 Bikeway, linking the largest trail system in the Front Range with over 145 miles.

== Retail ==
Westminster is home to The Orchard Town Center, an outdoor mall featuring over 90 speciality retailers, dining and entertainment located at the intersection of I-25 and 144th Avenue.

The city's major mall had previously been the Westminster Mall, demolished in 2012 to make way for the Downtown Westminster development.

== Downtown Westminster ==
Downtown Westminster is a 105-acre (42 ha) site almost equidistant between downtown Denver and Boulder. The new downtown will feature 18 acres of parks and public space. It integrates Smart City functionality to reduce consumption of water and energy and will have smart streetlights, parking garages, and meters.

Development began with the completion of over 300 housing units, including 118 affordable housing units. Downtown Westminster features an Alamo Drafthouse Cinema and a 125-room boutique hotel, the Origin Hotel.

Downtown Westminster is planned to house 300 hotel rooms, 2,300 multi-family, condo and townhouse residential units, 2 million square feet (190,000 m^{2}) of collaborative and class A office space, and 750,000 square feet (70,000 m^{2}) of retail space.

== Notable people ==
Notable individuals who were born in or have lived in Westminster include figure skater Mariah Bell, Texas newspaper publisher Frank Willis Mayborn, and silent film actor Pete Morrison.

== See also ==
- Denver-Aurora-Centennial, CO Metropolitan Statistical Area
- Denver-Aurora-Greeley, CO Combined Statistical Area
- Front Range Urban Corridor
