= Colorado State Register of Historic Properties =

Listing of significant historic properties in Colorado

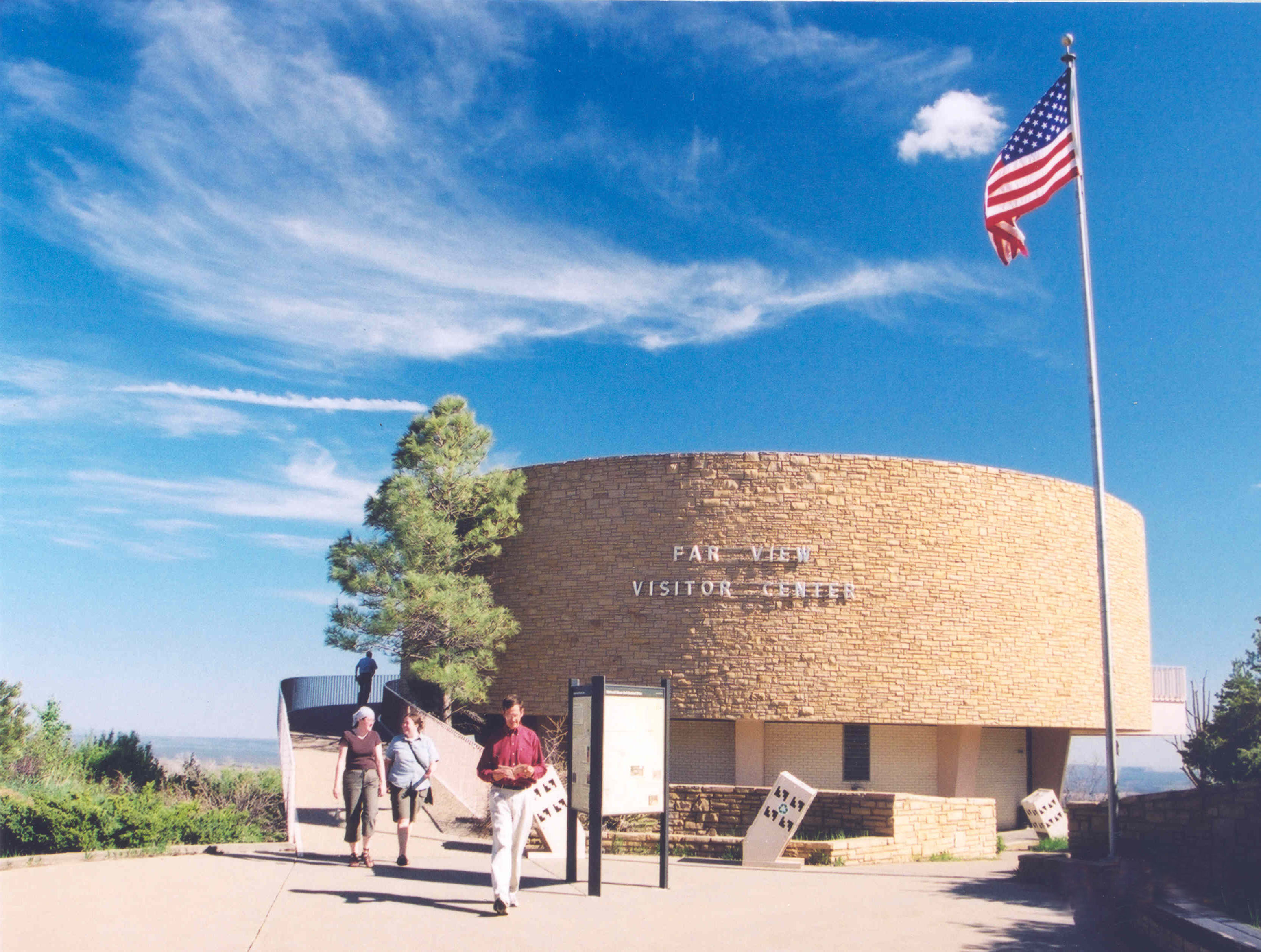

The Colorado State Register of Historic Properties, administered by the History Colorado Office of Archaeology and Historic Preservation, is a listing of significant historic resources. History Colorado maintains a list of the Colorado State Register of Historic Properties, which can include archaeological and historic structures, buildings, objects and districts. Properties are added to the state register by nomination to History Colorado. Any Colorado historic sites added to the National Register of Historic Places are automatically included in the Colorado State Register.

The state register includes over 1,700 listings, of which over 1,300 are also listed on the national register.

== Criteria ==
Criteria for inclusion in the state register include:

1. Association of the property with events that have made a significant contribution to history
2. Connection of the property with persons significant in history
3. Distinctive characteristics of a type, period, method of construction, or artisan
4. Geographic importance of the property
5. Possibility of important discoveries related to prehistory or history

Properties listed on the Colorado State Register of Historic Properties may also be recognized on the National Register of Historic Places, listed as either a National Historic Landmark or contributing property in a National Historic District.

== History Colorado ==
The Office of Archaeology and Historic Preservation, part of History Colorado (formerly Colorado Historical Society), is responsible for overseeing the Colorado State Register of Historic Properties and other state historic preservation programs.

== See also ==
- National Register of Historic Places listings in Colorado
- List of National Historic Landmarks in Colorado
