= Jeune Afrique Media Group =

- Industry: publication of journals and periodicals
- Founded: January 1958; 67 years ago
- Founder: Béchir Ben Yahmed
- Headquarters: Paris
- Website: www.jeuneafrique.com

Founded in Tunis in 1960 by Béchir Ben Yahmed, Jeune Afrique Media Group is a pan-African media group based in Paris. It publishes Jeune Afrique, The Africa Report, and Africa Business+, which cover African and international political and economical news in both English and French.

Jeune Afrique is often considered as the French-speaking magazine of reference for African elites. Since 2020, it is distributed on a monthly basis.

Jeune Afrique Media Group is the leading pan-African press publisher in terms of distribution. In 2012, the group diversified into events with the creation of The Africa CEO Forum. The group has also created the Africa Financial Industry Summit in 2021.
