= List of international prime ministerial trips made by Aziz Akhannouch =

This is a list of international prime ministerial trips made by Aziz Akhannouch, who served as the 17th Prime Minister of Morocco from 7 October 2021 to 29 September 2026.

During his premiership, Akhannouch made 48 trips to 32 countries. The number of visits per country are:

- 6 visits: France
- 4 visits: United States
- 3 visits: Saudi Arabia
- 2 visits: Angola, Belgium, Egypt, Qatar, Senegal, Spain, and the United Arab Emirates
- 1 visit: Bahrain, Brazil, Costa Rica, Ethiopia, Germany, Indonesia, Italy, Ivory Coast, Japan, Kenya, Mauritania, the Netherlands, Nigeria, Norway, Portugal, Russia, Rwanda, São Tomé and Príncipe, Switzerland, Vatican City, and the United Kingdom

== Trips ==
=== 2021 ===
Country	Location(s)	Dates	Details
Saudi Arabia	Riyadh	25–26 October	Represented King Mohammed VI at the Saudi Green Initiative and the Middle East Green Initiative. Met with Crown Prince Mohammed bin Salman.
United Kingdom	Glasgow	1–2 November	Represented Mohammed VI at the 2021 United Nations Climate Change Conference (COP26).
United Arab Emirates	Abu Dhabi; Dubai	25–26 December	Met with Sheikh Mohamed bin Zayed Al Nahyan and attended the national day of Morocco's pavilion at Expo 2020.

=== 2022 ===
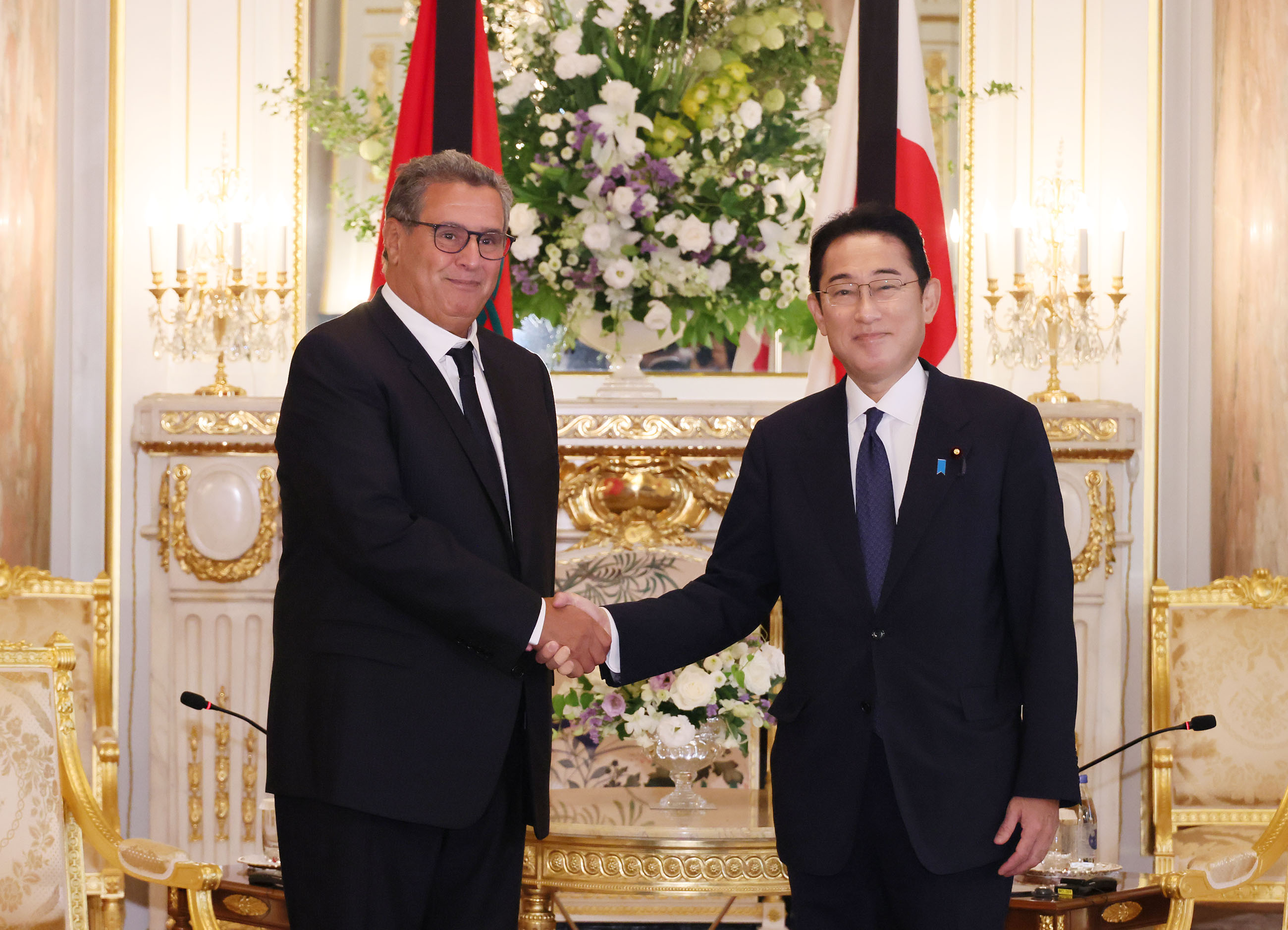
Aziz Akhannouch met with Japanese PM Fumio Kishida.

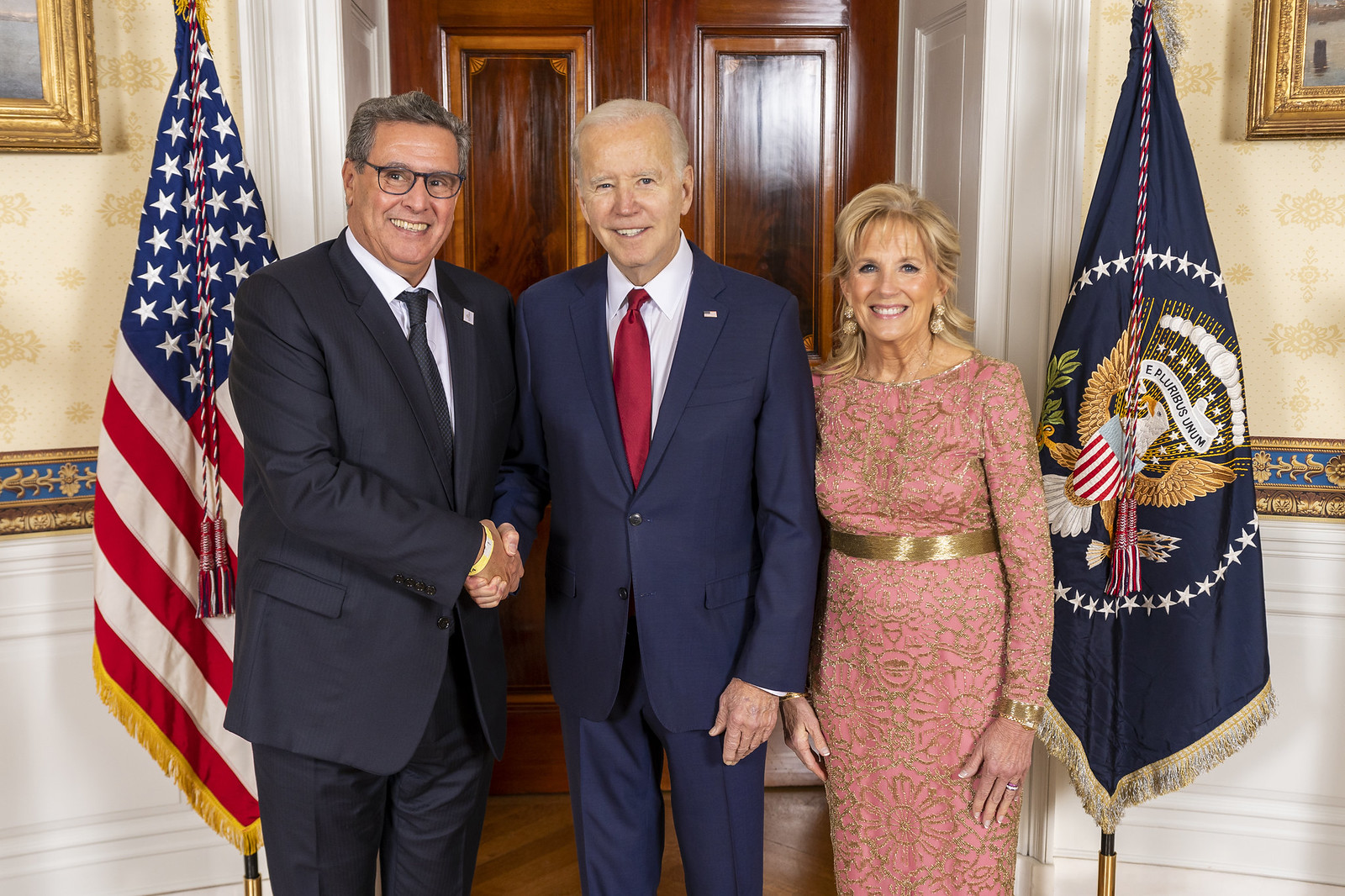
Aziz Akhannouch with Joe Biden and Jill Biden

Country	Location(s)	Dates	Details
Qatar	Doha	7 February	Co-chaired the eighth session of the Qatari-Moroccan Joint Supreme Committee.
France	Brest	9–11 February	Attended the One Ocean Summit.
Costa Rica	San José	8 May	Represented Mohammed VI at the inauguration of Costa Rican President Rodrigo Chaves Robles.
The Netherlands	The Hague; Rotterdam	31 May – 1 June	Attended the European People's Party (EPP) congress and met with Dutch Prime Minister Mark Rutte.
Belgium	Brussels	21 June	Attended the European Development Days Forum.
Angola	Luanda	15 September	Represented Mohammed VI at the second inauguration of Angolan President João Lourenço.
United States	New York City	19–23 September	Attended the general debate of the seventy-seventh session of the United Nations General Assembly.
Japan	Tokyo	27–28 September	Represented Mohammed VI at the state funeral of former prime minister Shinzo Abe. Met with concurrent prime minister Fumio Kishida.
Saudi Arabia	Riyadh	8 December	Represented Mohammed VI at the 2022 China-Arab States Summit.
United States	Washington, D.C.	13–15 December	Represented Mohammed VI at the United States–Africa Business Forum and United States–Africa Leaders Summit.

=== 2023 ===
Country	Location(s)	Dates	Details
Brazil	Brasília	1 January	Represented Mohammed VI at the third inauguration of Brazilian President Luiz Inácio Lula da Silva.
United Arab Emirates	Abu Dhabi	16 January	Attended the opening ceremony of the 2023 session of the Abu Dhabi Sustainability Week.
Switzerland	Davos	18–19 January	Attended the World Economic Forum.
Senegal	Dakar	25–27 January	Attended the Dakar Summit on Food Sovereignty.
Egypt	Cairo	12 February	Represented Mohammed VI at the high-level conference of the Al-Quds Committee.
Ethiopia	Addis Ababa	17–19 February	Represented Mohammed VI at the 36th African Union Summit.
Portugal	Lisbon	12 May	Met with Portuguese Prime Minister Antonio Costa and President Marcelo Rebelo de Sousa.
Nigeria	Abuja	30 May	Represented Mohammed VI at the inauguration ceremony of Nigerian President Bola Tinubu.
Ivory Coast	Abidjan	5–6 June	Attended the Africa CEO Forum.
Russia	Saint Petersburg	27–28 July	Represented Mohammed VI at the 2023 Russia–Africa Summit, leading a delegation comprising foreign minister Nasser Bourita and the Moroccan ambassador to Russia.
Belgium	Brussels	25 October	Akhannouch and foreign minister Nasser Bourita attended the Global Gateway forum and met with European Commission President Ursula von der Leyen.
Saudi Arabia	Riyadh	10–11 November	Represented Mohammed VI at the Saudi-African Economic Summit and at an Arab Islamic extraordinary summit conducted in response to the ongoing Gaza war.
Germany	Berlin	20 November	Attended a dialogue session where leaders of African countries and G20 partners met to tighten cooperation.

=== 2024 ===
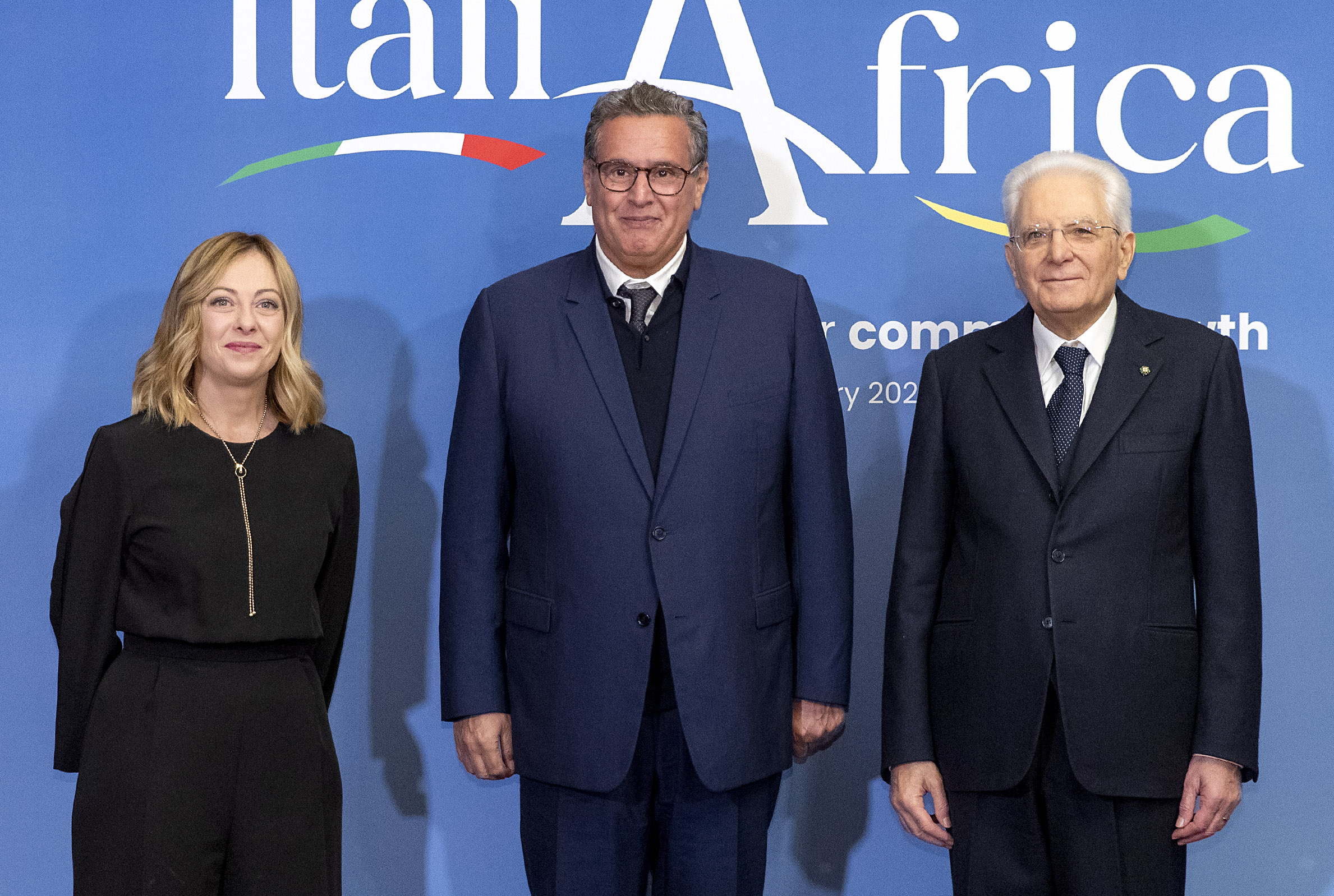
Akhannouch with Prime Minister Giorgia Meloni and President Sergio Mattarella at the 2024 Italy–Africa Summit

Country	Location(s)	Dates	Details
Italy	Rome	28–29 January	Represented Mohammed VI at the 'Italia-Africa: A bridge for common growth' summit.
Senegal	Diamniadio	2 April	Represented Mohammed VI at the inauguration ceremony of Senegalese President Bassirou Diomaye Faye.
Rwanda	Kigali	7 April	Represented Mohammed VI at the 30th anniversary commemoration of the Rwandan genocide.
Bahrain	Manama	15 May	Represented Mohammed VI at the 2024 Arab League summit.
Indonesia	Bali	18–25 May	Attended the tenth edition of the World Water Forum.
France	Paris	25–26 July	Represented Mohammed VI at the 2024 Summer Olympics opening ceremony.
Mauritania	Nouakchott	1 August	Represented Mohammed VI at the second inauguration of Mauritanian President Mohamed Ould Ghazouani.
France	Saint-Raphaël	15 August	Represented Mohammed VI at the 80th anniversary commemoration of the Provence landings.
United States	New York City	24–28 September	Attended the general debate of the seventy-ninth session of the United Nations General Assembly.
France	Villers-Cotterêts	4–5 October	Represented Mohammed VI at the 19th summit of the Organisation internationale de la Francophonie.

=== 2025 ===
Country	Location(s)	Dates	Details
France	Paris	22 February – 2 March	Inaugurated the Moroccan pavilion as Guest of Honor at the Paris International Agricultural Show in the presence of President Emmanuel Macron.
Vatican City	Vatican City	25–26 April	Represented Mohammed VI at the funeral of Pope Francis.
United States	New York City	23–26 September	Attended the general debate of the eightieth session of the United Nations General Assembly.
Spain	Madrid	4 December	Held bilateral talks with Spanish Prime Minister Pedro Sánchez during the 13th high-level meeting between the two countries and presided over the signing of multiple cooperation agreements.

=== 2026 ===
Country	Location(s)	Dates	Details
France	Paris	10 March	Attended an international summit on nuclear energy and met with President Emmanuel Macron and IAEA Director General Rafael Grossi.
Egypt	Cairo	5–6 April	Led a high-level delegation for the first session of the Egypt-Morocco Joint Coordination and Follow-Up Committee and held talks with Egyptian Prime Minister Mostafa Madbouly.
Kenya	Nairobi	11–12 May	Represented Mohammed VI at the “Africa Forward” Summit and the 4th Summit of the Congo Basin Climate Commission.
Qatar	Doha	13 July	Represented Mohammed VI at the offering of condolences to Emir Sheikh Tamim bin Hamad Al Thani following the death of his father.
Spain	Mallorca	1–2 August	Visited Mallorca amid discussions concerning regional migration challenges.
Angola	Luanda	30 August	Represented Mohammed VI at the African Union Peace Summit in Luanda.
São Tomé and Príncipe	São Tomé	3 September	Represented Mohammed VI at the second inauguration of President Carlos Vila Nova.
Norway	Oslo	8–9 September	Represented Mohammed VI at the state funeral of King Harald V.

== See also ==
- Foreign relations of Morocco
- List of international prime ministerial trips made by Saadeddine Othmani, his predecessor
