= Social media use in African politics =

Since the Egyptian Revolution in 2011 and the Tunisian Revolution, social media, especially Facebook, Twitter, and YouTube, began to gain traction as a political tool in Africa. Various political actors have used social media to pursue a wide range of political objectives. State actors can use social media to encourage political discourse, campaign, or implement censorship and surveillance. Non-state actors, such as civil society organizations and opposition movements, can use social media to address political concerns and to organize widespread uprisings, such as the 2014 Burkinabé uprising. Meanwhile, extremist organizations can use social media to further their propaganda and recruitment. However, social media has been criticized for its limited accessibility and for facilitating the spread of misinformation, causing some skepticism about its effectiveness.

Due to low entry barriers and user-generated content, social media provides a platform where people from different social classes can engage and interact with one another. Under traditional media, the public had limited opportunities to voice their political opinions. Social media enables people to both create and consume content. The public has become increasingly comfortable and confident in expressing political opinions online, often away from government scrutiny. Scholars argue that social media use has democratizing effects in African countries.

== State actors ==
=== Promoting political discourse ===
Through social media, the government and its citizens can discuss policy ideas, policy implementation, and political actions. Regardless of geographical location and distance, people are able to voice their opinions to the government. Social media includes citizens who were previously not able to express their discontent or share their ideas to the government. As state actors keep the public informed, social media can increase civic engagement. With more civic engagement, policies can be discussed without politicization. Before the commonplace use of social media, African countries faced weak feedback mechanisms that effectively excluded the average African citizen from policy discourse. In South Africa, the government uses social media to connect with constituencies. The South African president runs an official Twitter, Facebook, YouTube, and Flickr accounts to engage with the public.

=== Campaigning ===
Political parties also use social media for political campaigns during election periods. In South Africa, the ANC (African National Congress) and DA (Democratic Alliance) use social media for political purposes. These parties specifically use Facebook as a tool for campaigning and engaging with the public to improve their relationship with citizens. Nigerian President Goodluck Jonathan employed social media to campaign for the presidential election in 2011, which he won. When President Goodluck Jonathan announced his bid for the presidency on social media in 2010, it reached about 217,000 people. As his campaign progressed, President Goodluck Jonathan was able to increase his followers to half a million by early 2011.

=== Censorship & Surveillance ===
While state actors can use social media to encourage their party or discourse, social media can be used to censor and surveil citizens. For example, the ANC and DA use Facebook to monitor South Africans. The government is able to track down people who have spoken against the government and translate this information into physical action to stop any possibility of a revolution. Social media platforms can be shut down to manipulate the flow of information. In Chad, citizens cannot access information through online platforms. This censorship blocked "Facebook, Twitter, WhatsApp and Viber". In the Democratic Republic of Congo, the government shut down the internet before contested elections. In Zimbabwe, the government shut down the internet to hide civilian protests against fuel price increases.

== Non-state actors ==
=== Civil society organizations (CSOs) ===
Civil society organizations have also used social media networks in an effort to recruit supporters and communicate with the public. CSOs can use social media to mobilize people to support their cause, such as the Ghanaian Committee for Joint Action (CJA). In 2005 and 2006, the CJA gathered support to protest against the 50% fuel price increase. CSOs can play the role of a counterforce against state actors and state propaganda during times of crises, such as protests and military clashes. In some cases, CSOs release their own videos and photos on social media which challenges traditional forms of media. CSOs have also served to monitor elections to reduce corruption and violence during election day. For instance, the Zambian Bantu Watch started the #bantuwatch social media campaign to monitor the 2011 presidential election. Zambians used Facebook and Twitter to report polling station results to mitigate election fraud and election violence. In South Africa, CSOs created 'amandla.mobi' to campaign for public policies by creating petitions. Through 'amandla.mobi', CSOs are able to circulate petitions on social media to collect signatures. South African CSOs reported how social media helped their organizations to gain support and share ideas. However, CSOs struggle to attract media attention and often have to pay for media coverage.

=== Opposition forces against the government ===
Social media is also used by the public or opposition forces against the government. Through horizontal social media, organizing can lead to street protests and revolutions, some of which are successful. For instance, during the Egyptian revolution of 2011, "The Day of the Revolution Against Torture, Poverty, Corruption, and Unemployment" and "We Are All Khaled Said" gathered support against President Hosni Mubarak. In particular, "We Are All Khaled Said" had Egyptian citizens gather around the death of Khaled Said who was brutally tortured and killed by the Egyptian government because Said wanted to uncover government corruption. As unrest erupted into public demonstrations, President Hosni Mubarak was forced to resign. Witnessing the success of social media during the Egyptian revolution, the Tunisian Revolution, or the Jasmine Revolution, mobilized through Facebook and Twitter. Likewise, in South Africa, Malawi, and Mozambique, these countries have used social media as "new protest drums."

Due to social media's low entry barrier, opposition forces against the government can facilitate political discourse that can lead to accountability. Whistleblowers and opposition forces are able to expose corruption through social media, where they face less repression while reaching a larger audience. For example, the youth of Zimbabwe and South Africa use Facebook to discuss politics without judgment. Specifically, in Zimbabwe, political youth used Facebook to avoid state surveillance. Social media is used as a supplemental tool for activism. In 2015, South African student activists started the hashtag #RhodesMustFall to push the issue of colonialism and racism at the forefront of the public.

=== Extremist organizations ===
Social media is easily accessible and created by user-based content. Therefore, marginalized groups are able to use social media to spread extremist ideas. For instance, Boko Haram created the Media Office of West Africa Province and perpetuated propaganda through Twitter and YouTube. Boko Haram's online propaganda campaign targets and persuades young dissuaded Nigerians to join their cause. Social media has also been used against Boko Haram. In April 2014, Boko Haram kidnapped 276 schoolgirls and an international campaign fought for their return through #BringBackOurGirls. Another extremist group, Al-Shabaab, has created an online presence through Twitter and YouTube. Through these social media networks, Al-Shabaab recruits new members to their extremist group through their propaganda which emphasizes the group's successes. Albeit their efforts, Al-Shabaab has not been very successful in coordinating their members but they are successful in financing their group. Furthermore, the Islamic State of Iraq and the Levant (ISIL) use social media to target and recruit individuals to their cause. ISIL's social media usage is more diverse compared to Boko Haram and Al-Shabaab; ISIL uses "Facebook, Twitter, YouTube, WhatsApp, Telegram, JustPaste.it, Kik and Ask.fm." Since ISIL's Twitter accounts kept getting shut down, ISIL uses Telegram and WhatsApp chat rooms to privately conduct meetings. Due to the spread of extremist ideology, Zhuravskaya et al. acknowledge social media's potential to be misused.

== Challenges ==
Although social media can be used as a political tool, it faces challenges in Africa. Due to low literacy rates in Africa, social media networks exclude many of the population members. In addition, lack of access to electricity and the internet can further hinder people from expressing their political opinions online. Some African citizens reported they cannot use social media due to expensive internet expenses. Furthermore, social media networks are vulnerable to misinformation as gatekeeping is weakened. Fake news can undermine the quality of news and create echo chambers, which can contribute to political polarization. Thus, extremist groups are able to use social media as propaganda, recruitment, and fundraising tool. There is also skepticism about the overall effectiveness of social media in politics by African activists. Furthermore, Zhuravskaya et al. examine how social media activism may decrease physical and concrete political activism. Social media is also criticized for its lack of credibility, real leadership, and power that may create internal struggles and undermine the organization.

== See also ==
- Social media use in politics
- Arab Spring
- Tunisian Revolution
- 2014 Burkinabé uprising
- #RhodesMustFall
