= Alifa Farouk =

Tunisian politician and diplomat

Alifa Chaabane Farouk (born 17 October 1946) is a Tunisian politician and diplomat. She was the Tunisian ambassador to Germany. Farouk was a member of the executive board of the National Union of Tunisian Women from 1989 to 1995.

== Life and career ==
Farouk was born in an outskirt town of Metline, 30 kilometers north of Tunis. She studied German from 1966 to 1969, and Political Science and Public International Law at LMU Munich in Germany where she finished with a Doctorate Degree in 1976. From 1979 to 1980, she studied International Company Law at the University of Paris II. After her studies in France, she worked briefly at Jeune Afrique Media Group. Her diplomatic career began at the Tunisian embassy in Bonn, Germany where she worked from 1976 to 1979. Farouk was Director of the Investment Promotion Agency from 1981 to 1992 before taking charge of the Ministry of International Cooperation and Foreign Investments from 1992 to 1994 and later became the head of mission in the office of the President of the Republic from 1994 to 1995. In February 2010, she was appointed Tunisian Ambassador to Germany serving for only one year there. Farouk was Vice-president of the World Organization of Mediators and of the Association of Ombudsmen and Mediators of the Francophonie (AOMF). She assumed the office of the President of the Association of African Ombudsmen at the general assembly of the organization in Muldersdrift (South Africa) in 2005.
