= Rhodes Must Fall =

South African protest movement

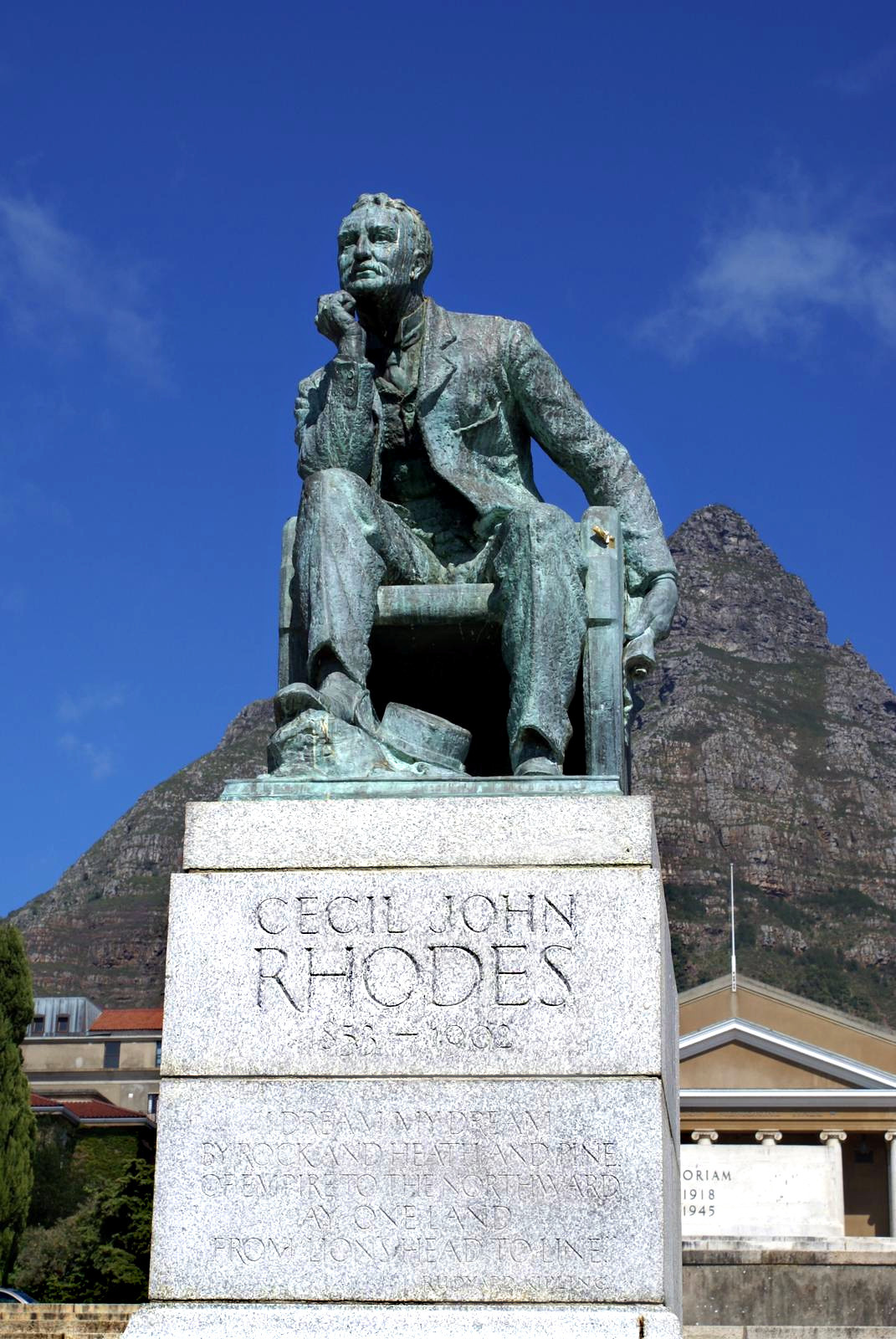
- Statue of Cecil Rhodes by Marion Walgate (1934), on its former site before removal
- Date: 9 March 2015
- Location: University of Cape Town
- Caused by: Perceived lack of transformation in South Africa following colonialism and apartheid
- Goals: Removal of the statue of Cecil Rhodes on campus, "decolonisation of education" and "racial transformation" at the university
- Methods: Occupation; Civil disobedience; Demonstrations; Internet activism
- Result: Statue removed 9 April 2015

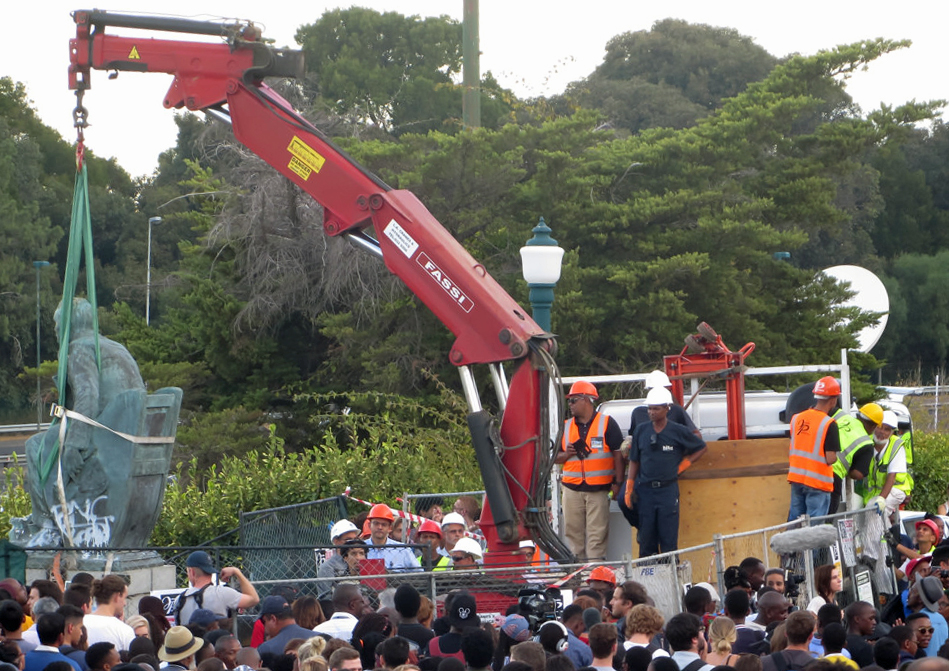
Statue being removed on 9 April 2015

Rhodes Must Fall was a protest movement that began on 9 March 2015, originally directed against a statue at the University of Cape Town (UCT) that commemorates Cecil Rhodes. The campaign for the statue's removal received global attention and led to a wider movement to decolonise education across South Africa. On 9 April 2015, following a UCT Council vote the previous night, the statue was removed.

Rhodes Must Fall captured national headlines throughout 2015 and sharply divided public opinion in South Africa. It also inspired the emergence of allied student movements at other universities, both within South Africa and elsewhere in the world.

== Background ==
A bronze statue of a seated Cecil Rhodes, a 19th-century British industrialist, was sculpted by Marion Walgate (née Mason), the wife of architect Charles Walgate. Charles had worked with fellow architect Joseph Michael Solomon in designing and constructing several buildings of the University of Cape Town (UCT) during this period. Marion's statue of Rhodes was unveiled in 1934 and installed on the UCT campus, as the university was built on land donated by Rhodes. Calls for the statue's removal had been slowly increasing for several decades, with Afrikaner students first demanding the removal of the statue in the 1950s.

== Ideology and goals ==
Rhodes Must Fall describes itself as "a collective movement of students and staff members mobilising for direct action against the reality of institutional racism at the University of Cape Town." Whilst initially being focused on the removal of the statue of Cecil John Rhodes, Rhodes Must Fall states that "the fall of 'Rhodes' is symbolic for the inevitable fall of white supremacy and privilege at our campus."

The movement was initially about the removal of the statue of Cecil Rhodes, a symbol which the protesters felt was oppressive, and grew to encompass institutional racism, the lack of racial transformation at the university, and access to tertiary education and student accommodation.

Students made use of occupation, civil disobedience, and violence during the protests. Actions included throwing human feces at the Rhodes statue, occupying UCT offices, and burning art, vehicles, and buildings. Students also made use of the internet; protesting students created a Facebook page entitled 'Rhodes Must Fall' and promoted and made use of the hashtag '#RhodesMustFall' on Twitter.

=== Leaders ===
The first action of the movement took place on 9 March 2015, when Chumani Maxwele "picked up one of the buckets of faeces that sat reeking on the kerbside" and "hurled its contents" to a bronze statue of Rhodes, as reported by The Guardian. The Times later named Chumani as "The faeces-throwing activist who orchestrated the #RhodesMustFall campaign at UCT." Ntokozo Qwabe was named as "one of the leaders of the Rhodes Must Fall movement at Oxford University in the UK" by BusinessTech and by the Daily Mirror. Parisian magazine Jeune Afrique named Youssef Robinson "one of the leaders of the movement in Britain." Athabile Nonxuba was also named a leader of the movement at UCT by City Press. National Public Radio interviewed Kgotsi Chikane and named him "one of the leaders of the Rhodes Must Fall movement."

== Protests ==
=== 2015 Protests: The statue, decolonisation ===
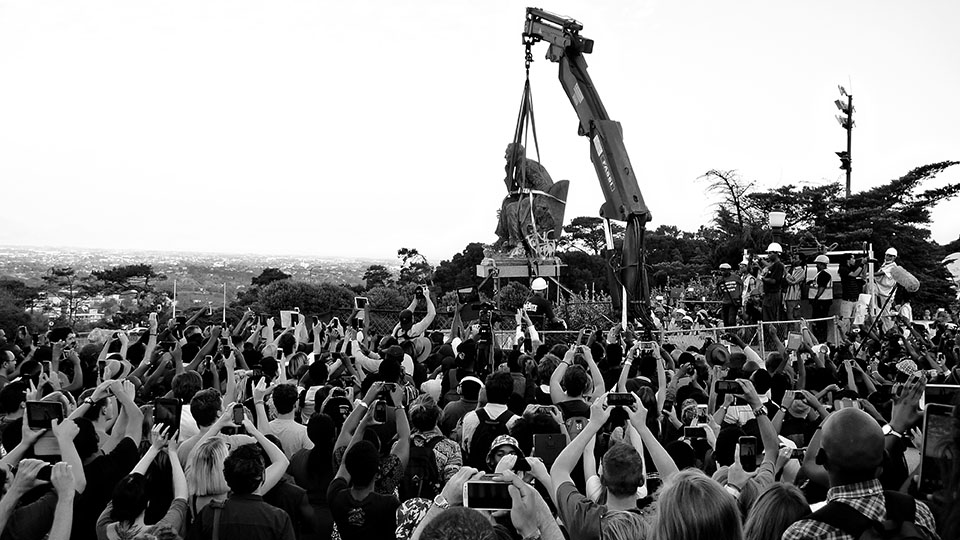
Rhodes falls (9 April 2015)

The first protest, and the action that started the Rhodes Must Fall campaign occurred on 9 March 2015, when Chumani Maxwele threw human faeces onto the statue and toyi-toyied with approximately a dozen protesters at the statue. Maxwele was charged with assault after he was involved in a physical altercation with a security officer during the protest. It was reported that a UCT security officer had prevented a photographer from taking photos of the protest. UCT announced that it was investigating the incident.

=== Escalation of Protests at UCT ===
On 12 March 2015, people held an open discussion on the stairs of Jammie Plaza, an important area on UCT's Upper Campus, to talk about the statue and hear different opinions.The following week, people marched to the UCT administration building called Bremner to demand a date for when the statue would be removed.On 20 March 2015, students stormed the Bremner building, which houses the UCT offices during a speech addressing the removal of the statue by UCT vice-chancellor Max Price. On 22 March, it was reported that the students were still occupying the building and that members of the public were supplying them with food. The protesters "renamed" the building Azania House, an indication that the movement takes an Africanist position on national identity, thus rejecting the civic and non-racial tradition of the ANC.

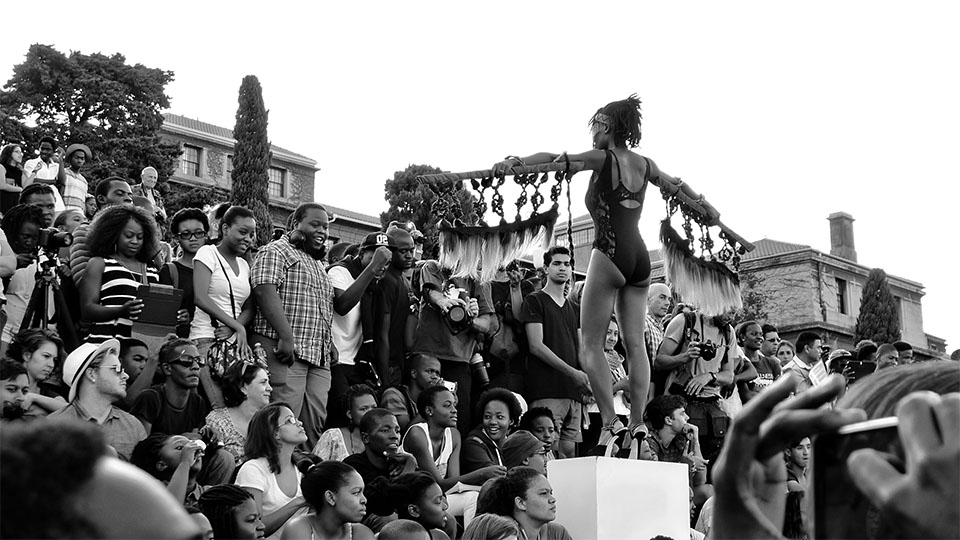
Tankiso Mamabolo, drama students turn Rhodes Must Fall campus protests (9 April 2015)

UCT's senate voted in favour of the removal of the statue on 27 March 2015, and following the vote, the statue was boarded up pending the final decision from the university's council. On 9 April 2015 the Rhodes statue was removed, and later moved into storage.

Protest quickly spread around South Africa's universities, defacing statues and calling for the "decolonisation of education" in South Africa.

==== Racist statements ====
===== "One Settler, One Bullet" =====
On 8 April 2015 protesters disrupted the UCT Council meeting which had been called to discuss the removal of the statue and prevented members of the council from leaving. According to a statement issued by Max Price, Vice-Chancellor of UCT, protestors chanted "One Settler, One Bullet", a rallying cry during apartheid, both at the meeting and the following day during the removal of the statue. On Tuesday 14 April 2015, Rhodes Must Fall issued a statement from its official Facebook page calling on its members to join a protest in the parking lot of the Bremner Building which ended with the slogan "One Settler, One Bullet!" This post was subsequently deleted.

===== Support for Mcebo Dlamini =====
On 25 April 2015, Mcebo Dlamini, then president of the Students' Representative Council (SRC) of Wits University, stated in a Facebook post that he "loves Adolf Hitler" and admired Hitler for his "charisma" and "organisational skills." In the same post Dlamini also stated that he "loves Robert Mugabe." Dlamini later declared during a radio interview on PowerFM, "Jews are devils," a remark which led the South African Jewish Board of Deputies to lay criminal charges of hate speech against him. Dlamini was ultimately dismissed as SRC President on unrelated charges of misconduct. Wits University Vice Chancellor Adam Habib stated, "I believe that Mr Dlamini has single-handedly wrought more damage on Wits University's reputation than any other person who I can think of in at least the last two decades."

On 7 May 2015 Rhodes Must Fall tweeted "Why Mcebo Dlamini's views on Hitler are not outrageous", including a link to an anonymous letter in the student newspaper Wits Vuvuzela bearing this title. On the same day Eyewitness News reported that the Rhodes Must Fall movement stated that it "rejects the removal of Wits SRC President Mcebo Dlamini."

=== 2016 protests: accommodation, decolonisation, and institutional culture ===
Protests resumed at the University of Cape Town at the start of the academic year on 15 February 2016, when members of the Rhodes Must Fall movement constructed a shack at a heavily used pedestrian crossing and road at the base of the Jameson Steps on the university's main campus. The shack was set up to protest what some students perceived as a lack of housing for black students and unfairness in the allocation of student housing. The university responded, stating that the shack needed to be relocated by 5 p.m. the following day, as its placement was causing traffic congestion. The following day, the shack was removed after 6 p.m. by the university. In response, Rhodes Must Fall supporters vandalised two statues, one of Jan Smuts and another of Maria Emmeline Barnard Fuller; burned paintings, predominantly portraits of white people, collected from university buildings (including two collages in remembrance of the revered anti-apartheid activist Molly Blackburn, five anti-apartheid-themed paintings by black artist Keresemose Richard Baholo, who was the first black student to receive a master's degree in Fine Art from UCT and who later supported the activists' actions); torched three vehicles, including a Jammie Shuttle transport bus; and petrol-bombed the office of the university's vice-chancellor.

The University of Cape Town stated that the shortage, 6,680 beds for 27,000 students, was due to three reasons: greatly increased student numbers caused by lower fees, students rewriting deferred exams caused by the protests the previous year, and the clearance of historical student debt increasing the number of returning students. The university also stated that their ability to respond to the housing problem was hampered by the occupation of three buildings hosting the Student Housing department by Rhodes Must Fall protesters. The university also refuted protesters' claims of prioritising the housing of white students, stating that 75% of students in university residences were black. The university claimed that a number of the protesters were not university students and that due to the "intimidation of others, demeaning utterances, and distortion of facts" it was taking criminal action against the protesters. Eight protesters were arrested on charges of public violence and malicious damage.

In the same week, non-black students were also barred from the UCT residences' dining hall by Rhodes Must Fall protesters and denied food from the cafeteria.

Similar protests erupted across South Africa during February 2016 with protests at North-West University, University of the Free State, University of the Witwatersrand, University of Pretoria, and the University of KwaZulu-Natal.

== Reactions ==
On 22 March 2015, UCT lecturer Xolela Mangcu told the Cape Times newspaper that the university was not hiring enough black professors. He said that only 5 out of the 200 senior professors at the university were black. A week later, Julius Malema of the Economic Freedom Fighters agreed that the statue should be removed and that the student protests were against not only the statue, but white supremacy itself. Albie Sachs suggested to "keep him [Rhodes] alive on the campus and force him, even if posthumously, to witness surroundings that tell him and the world that he is now living in a constitutional democracy."

During March 2015, the Faculty of Engineering & the Built Environment at the University of Cape Town ran a poll on whether or not the statue should be moved. Out of 2700 students, 1100 students voted. Sixty percent of them were against the removal of the statue, 38% were in favour of its removal and the remaining 2% abstained. However, the poll did not measure strength of opinion. A consensus in the Senate found that many who were against removal did not feel strongly about the issue.

Apartheid-era president, F. W. de Klerk has criticised the movement, calling the movement a "folly" and the students "full of sound and fury". He argued that Rhodes was "the architect of the Anglo-Boer War that had a disastrous impact on our people, yet the National Party government never thought of removing his name from our history". De Klerk continued on by saying in a letter to The Times that for better or for worse, "Rhodes had made an impact on history, which included the positive contribution of his scholarship scheme."

Members of the governing party ANC criticized the movement. For example, education minister Blade Nzimande accused them of being "ultra-left formations" controlled by the EFF and accused them of having "an anti-ANC government agenda by those who cannot win power through the ballot".

Some critics of the movement worried that the focus was on quantity rather than quality of education, and that an increase in the number of students accepted to universities would have led to a decrease in the quality of their education, as money which would have gone towards securing quality educators would have gone instead to subsidising students' fees. Sikhakhane drew parallels between South Africa's path and the situation in Chile and Colombia.

The university protests were criticised for their increasingly violent nature and their racism against non-black students, especially their "extreme hatred of whites". Some black students claimed they feared retribution if they did not support the protests.

== Other universities ==
The start of the movement at the University of Cape Town resulted in the emergence of a broader movement in other universities in South Africa, United Kingdom and the United States to address black alienation within higher education.

=== Stellenbosch University ===
In mid April 2015, the student- and staff-led activist organisation Open Stellenbosch was founded at the University of Stellenbosch to promote similar aims, but with more of a focus on the role of language—specifically Afrikaans—in education at the university. The organisation was inspired by the Rhodes Must Fall movement at the University of Cape Town. Four independent University of Cape Town students produced a short video documentary called Luister in which students attending Stellenbosch and Elsenburg College explained their experiences of racism and slow transformation at the university and the college. On 12 November 2015, the University of Stellenbosch's Rector's Management Team recommended a new language policy in line with Open Stellenbosch's demands; specifically the adoption of English as a lingua franca.

=== Rhodes University ===
At Rhodes University, the Black Students Movement was started on 17 March in solidarity with the UCT Rhodes Must Fall Movement. The movement then began agitating for the name of Rhodes University to change, and has since made several interventions towards transforming Rhodes University, which it regards as a colonial university. In late May 2015, following protests and complaints by the Black Students Movement, the university, Rhodes University (named after Cecil Rhodes) approved plans to formally begin the process of changing the university's name.

In 2017, the Rhodes University Council voted 15–9 in favour of keeping the existing name. While the university agreed with critics that "[it] cannot be disputed that Cecil John Rhodes was an arch-imperialist and white supremacist who treated people of this region as sub-human", it also said it had long since distanced itself from the person and had distinguished itself with the name Rhodes University as one of the world's best. The main argument against the change was financial, as such a change would cost a significant amount of money and the university was already having trouble with its budget. Furthermore, changing the university's name could have an adverse effect on its recognition internationally.

=== University of Pretoria ===
On 19 February 2016, the AfriForum Youth, the Progressive Youth Alliance, and the EFF as well as the Democratic Alliance Student Organization (DASO) met with the university to vote on the removal of Afrikaans as a language of instruction. Following clashes between students and police, 24 students were arrested for public violence. The following day, the university announced that the Hatfield and Groenkloof campuses would be closed until the university could ensure the safety of its students and staff.

On 22 February 2016, the university proposed that its medium of instruction would become English-only. Protests against Afrikaans continued, with students boycotting classes and forcing other students out of their lectures. Lectures were cancelled as a result.

=== University of the Free State ===
On 22 February 2016, a group of 35 people consisting of contract workers and students, were arrested at the University of the Free State on charges of contempt of court and illegal gathering.

=== Oriel College, University of Oxford, UK ===
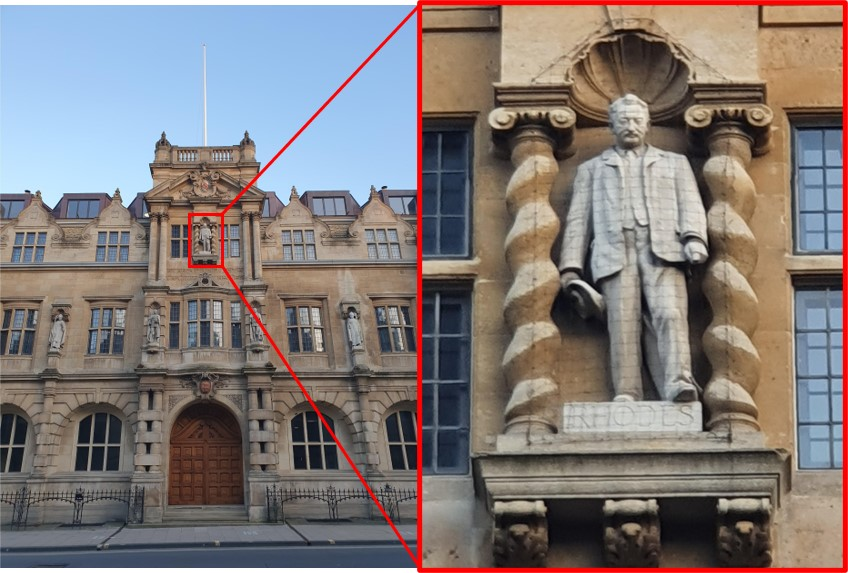
The High Street facade of Oriel College, Oxford, UK, with the Cecil Rhodes Statue magnified. This statue has been the focus of the Rhodes Must Fall movement in Oxford to date.

At the University of Oxford, students called for a statue of Rhodes to be removed from Oriel College, and started a movement at the university to better represent non-white culture in the curriculum as well as to combat racial discrimination and insensitivity. Organising members of Rhodes Must Fall in Oxford stated that awareness should be raised at the university about the institution's implication in colonialism and the violence that accompanied it, and that representation of 'black voices' should be improved.

On 19 January 2016, students at the Oxford Union (a private student debating society, without official endorsement or links to the University of Oxford) voted 245 to 212 in favour of removing the statue of Rhodes. Ultimately, on 29 January 2016, it was announced that the statue would remain; The Telegraph reported that "furious donors threatened to withdraw gifts and bequests worth more than £100 million" if it were removed.

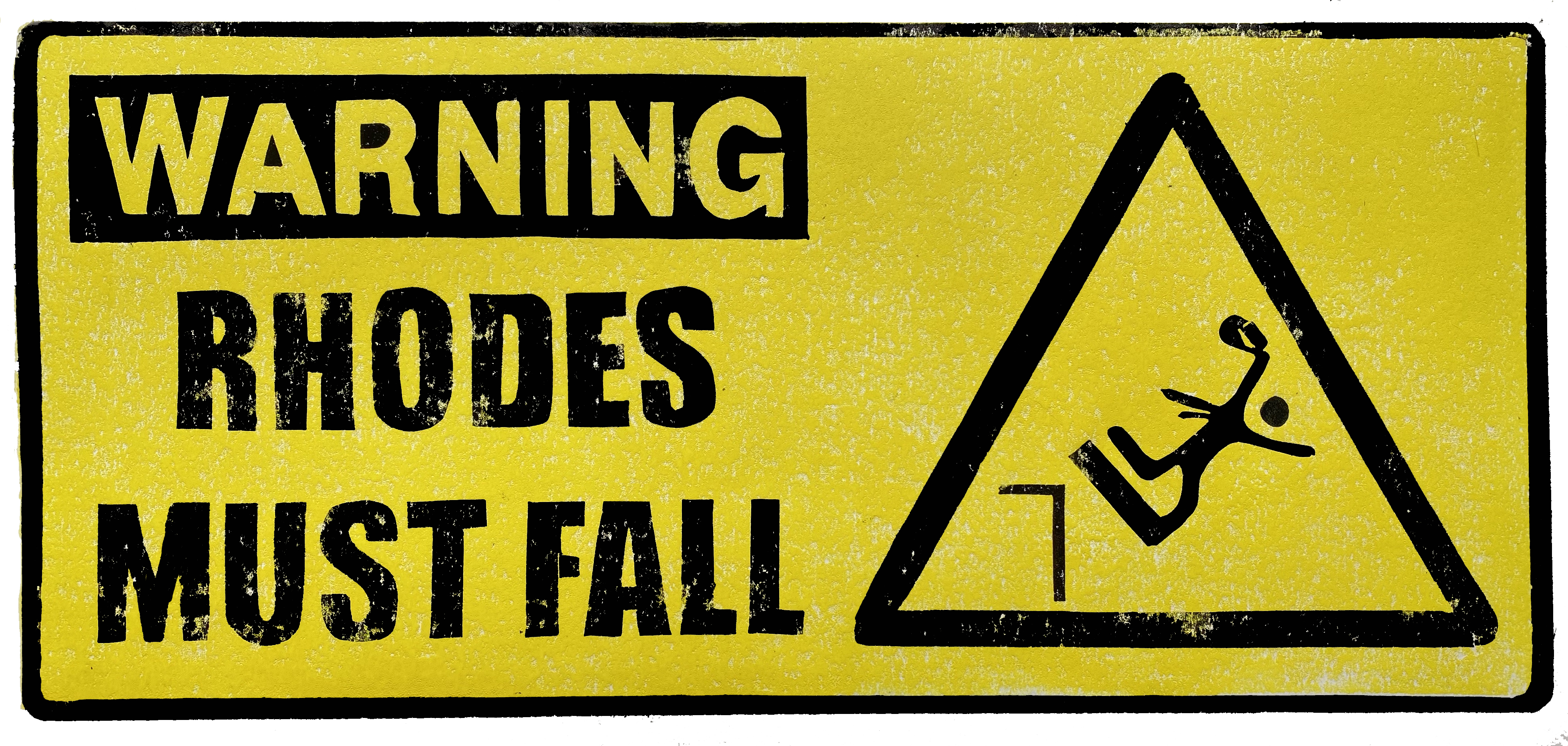
Rhodes Must Fall print protest sign by FJ Morris

The legacy of Cecil Rhodes at The University of Oxford is far-reaching, as in his will Rhodes established The Rhodes Scholarships. Each year, some 100 international students are selected to study at Oxford under the scholarship that bears Rhodes' name. This scholarship is regarded as one of the most prestigious scholarships in the world. When some of those in receipt of the scholarship were challenged over their opposition to iconography of Rhodes in Oxford, they commented "this scholarship does not buy our silence" and claimed that "...there is no hypocrisy in being a recipient of a Rhodes scholarship and being publicly critical of Cecil Rhodes and his legacy". This followed a number of criticisms by British media outlets, and on social media, against the scholarship holders Ntokozo Qwabe and Joshua Nott in response to their involvement in the movement. The students commented that "...a wave of ad hominem and unfounded accusations, hate speech and racism have flooded social media, the press and indeed Ntokozo's personal inbox.".

In June 2020, the issue was again brought to attention during the George Floyd protests in the United Kingdom. Two large Rhodes Must Fall protests took place outside Oriel College, on High Street in central Oxford to call for the removal of the Rhodes statue from the Oriel building. The first protest occurred on 9 June 2020 and was attended by over 1000 people. The second protest occurred on the 16th of June and was a march from Cowley, a nearby suburb of Oxford, through to the Oriel College building on High Street and onto the University of Oxford Museum of Natural History. Both protests were peaceful. On 17 June 2020, some University of Oxford professors expressed opinions in support of the Rhodes Must Fall movement at Oxford. In particular, within a letter to The Telegraph, they criticised the University of Oxford Vice-Chancellor Louise Richardson for claims she made concerning the Rhodes Must Fall movement engaging in the 'hiding of history'. In response to this, meetings of Oriel College undergraduates, the Oriel junior common room (JCR), and the Oriel graduates, the Oriel middle common room (MCR), each passed motions calling for the removal of the statue. On 17 June 2020, the Oriel College Governing Body convened to vote on the possible removal of the Rhodes statue. The outcome of this meeting was that the college would formally move to have the Cecil Rhodes statue removed from their building, along with the King Edward Street Plaque. The announcement was not for the immediate removal of the statue, but rather that the college move to immediately establish an 'independent Commission of Inquiry into the key issues surrounding the Rhodes statue', and that the submission from the College Governing Body to this commission would be for the removal of the Rhodes statue and plaque. The commission will be led by Carole Souter CBE, the current Master of St Cross College, Oxford and it was announced that the commission will accept written and oral evidence from all stakeholders including activist groups such as Rhodes Must Fall, and the general public. The Commission intends to report by the end of 2020. Councillor Susan Brown, Leader of Oxford City Council, welcomed this announcement and invited an 'early submission of a formal planning application from Oriel to accompany the review process and feed into it'. Should Oriel College submit a planning application for the removal of the statue from what the college refers to as 'The Rhodes Building' listed building consent and the permission from Historic England will be required, as the building is grade II* listed.

The possible removal of the Rhodes statue at Oriel College follows a 2016 YouGov survey in Britain which reported that 59% of respondents agreed that Rhode's statue should not be taken down, and 44% agreed with the statement that "we should be proud of British colonialism".

In June 2020, international lawyer Ann Olivarius, a former Rhodes Scholar, wrote an op-ed in The Financial Times advocating replacing the Cecil Rhodes statue with two other Rhodes Scholars, Alain Locke, the first African-American scholar and Zambian human rights advocate Lucy Banda-Sichone. That same month, the governing body of Oxford's Oriel college voted to remove the statue of Rhodes. Later that month, a blog article in the London Review of Books by academic Natalya Din-Kariuki suggested that though Rhodes Must Fall had made a good start, anti-racist organising in UK higher education had much further to go. In May 2021, sculptor Antony Gormley suggested not taking the statue down but turning it around, so that it would face the wall.

=== Harvard Law School, US ===
In Fall 2015 a group of law students calling itself Royall Must Fall and inspired by Rhodes Must Fall called for the retirement of the Harvard Law School shield, publishing an open letter to law school dean Martha Minow in the Harvard Law Record and posting signs and posters throughout the campus. Depicting three wheat sheaves, the shield incorporated the coat of arms of Isaac Royall Jr., a Harvard benefactor who had endowed the law school's first professorship. The shield had become a source of contention among Royall Must Fall activists because of the Royall family's history as slave-owners.

The movement's inception was accompanied by several controversial incidents, most notably when black tape was mysteriously placed over the portraits of prominent African-American faculty members. In addition to spurring several students to express their views about the incident in an "#HLSUntaped" feature in the law school's student newspaper and at on-campus assemblies, the controversy soon eclipsed the law school and garnered university-wide interest, with several articles published in The Harvard Crimson and with some Harvard undergraduates joining protesting law students in solidarity. Several national news organisations picked up on the controversy as well.

After the shield was ordered retired on 15 March 2016, Royall Must Fall renamed itself Reclaim Harvard Law and broadened its focus. Prominent members of Reclaim included third-year student A.J. Clayborne, but the group was organised in an equitable manner to counteract the perceived hierarchical nature of Harvard Law School. Reclaim sparked controversy when it occupied the law school's lounge and renamed it Belinda Hall after Belinda Sutton, a female slave who was enslaved by the Royall family. After conservative students placed posters in the occupied lounge that were then torn down by students from Reclaim, Dean Martha Minow reaffirmed the school's commitment to free speech in an email to the student body and in the school's student newspaper. This and other incidents sparked an on-campus debate in Spring 2016 about whether free speech could undermine social justice. As part of the debate, the Harvard Law Record's editor-in-chief and third-year law student Michael Shammas faced criticism from right-wing students for refusing to publish videos of activists tearing down pro-free speech posters, as well as criticism from some left-wing activists for accepting conservative op-eds for publication. Shammas, who was politically liberal, noted that even though he supported anti-racist protesters, his role was "editor-in-chief, not thought-policeman-in-chief." Prominent Harvard Law professors such as Duncan Kennedy, Annette Gordon-Reed, Randall Kennedy, and Scott Brewer also weighed in, including in national newspapers such as The New York Times.

The effects of the Royall Must Fall and Reclaim Harvard Law continue to be felt on the law school campus today. In September 2017, the school unveiled a plaque acknowledging slavery's role in its history, which reads, "May we pursue the highest ideals of law and justice in their memory." The controversies that occurred over the 2015-2016 year are recounted from a conservative perspective in a book by Kayleigh McEnany, a prominent conservative and former Trump spokeswoman who was a third-year law student at the time. McEnany's view of the controversy, in which she is critical of the protesters, differs from many expressed at the time. Indeed, some students who defended free speech during the controversy nonetheless wrote that they suspected that some on-campus conservatives may have rallied around free speech as a way to fight Reclaim's aims while hiding their own racism.

Several articles appeared comparing the Rhodes Must Fall and Royall Must Fall movements, in both positive and negative lights.

=== Other ===
Small student protests in support of or directly inspired by the removal of the statue and the Rhodes Must Fall movement also occurred at the University of Edinburgh and the University of California, Berkeley. Berkeley protesters felt the demands of the Rhodes Must Fall movement were relevant to their own grievances of perceived black marginalisation at Berkeley. At the University of Cambridge the movement catalysed the creation of similar 'decolonisation' student led initiatives such as the return of the okukor cockerel statue (taken during the punitive Benin Expedition of 1897) at Jesus College to Nigeria.

== Other statues ==
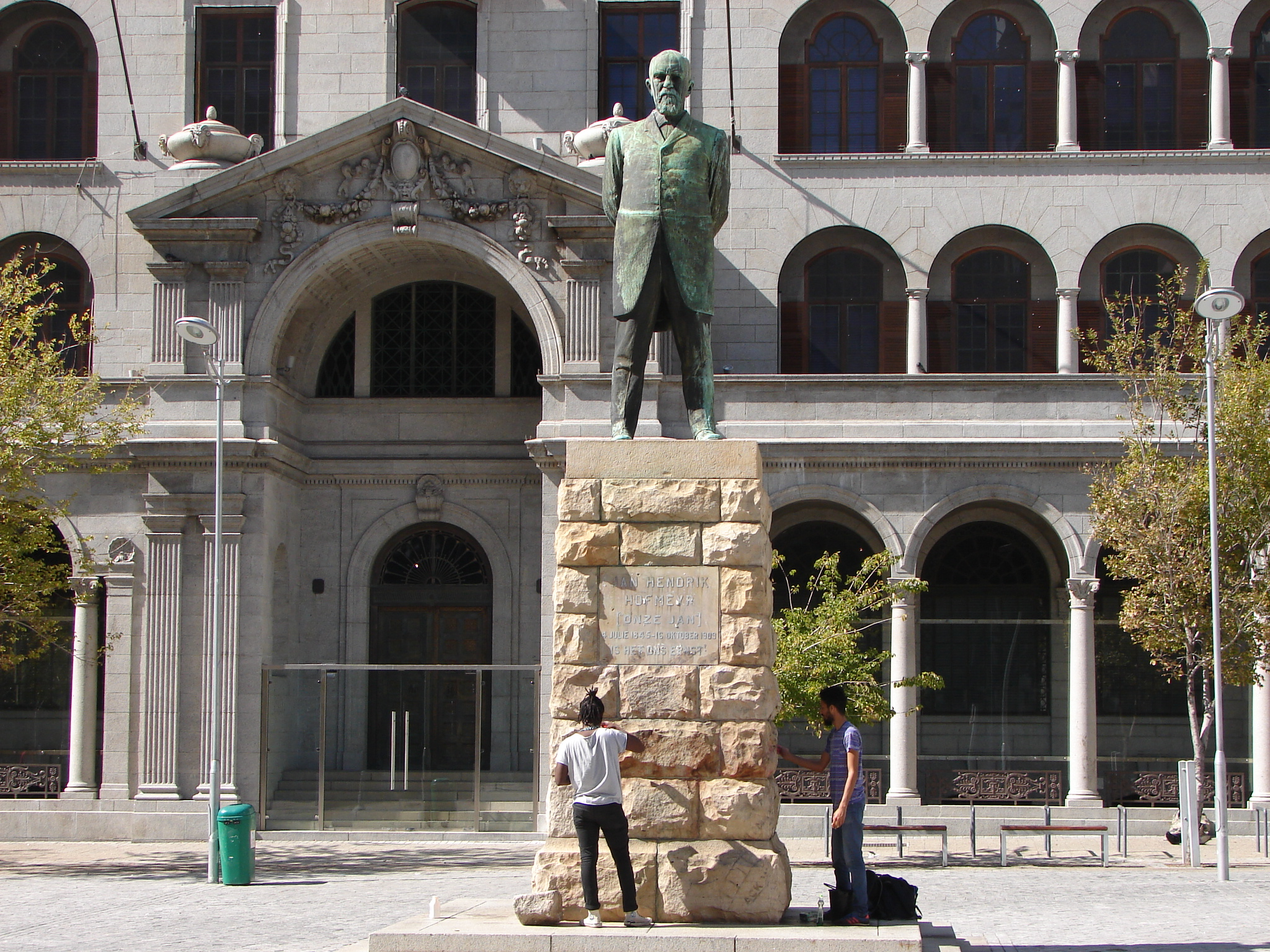
The paint-smeared base of the statue of J.H. Hofmeyr in Cape Town being cleaned by a pair of non-protesting volunteers on 11 April 2015

On 22 March 2015, the EFF's president, Julius Malema, called for all other symbols of colonialism and apartheid in South Africa to be removed. Following that, a number of colonial era statues across the country were vandalised, including the statue of King George V at the University of KwaZulu-Natal. EFF members were implicated in the vandalism of a number of Second Boer War statues, including that on 4 April of the Uitenhage War memorial statue for fallen British troops, a 6 April attack on the Horse Memorial in Port Elizabeth dedicated to the animals that served in the war, and the 7 April vandalism, with green paint, of Paul Kruger's statue in Church Square, Pretoria. The statue of Louis Botha situated outside the Houses of Parliament in Cape Town was vandalised on 9 April.

EFF spokesperson Mbuyeseni Ndlozi said on 9 April that the party would have to take responsibility for its members' actions, but that the EFF was for the removal, not vandalism or destruction, of colonial and apartheid symbols in the public space.

In response to the vandalism of the Louis Botha Statue and Horse Memorial, local supporters of the monuments laid wreaths at the monuments a few days afterwards. To protect it from future vandalism, the Horse Memorial was temporarily moved to a safe space by the local municipality. The chairperson of the Nelson Mandela Bay region of the EFF, Bo Madwara, threatened to "unload it into the sea" should the monument be restored.

On 18 September 2015, the bronze bust of Rhodes at Rhodes Memorial was vandalised. The nose was cut off and the memorial was daubed with graffiti accusing Rhodes of being a "Racist, thief, [and] murderer". It appeared that the vandals had attempted to cut off the whole head. In October 2018, the nose was restored by a local artist.

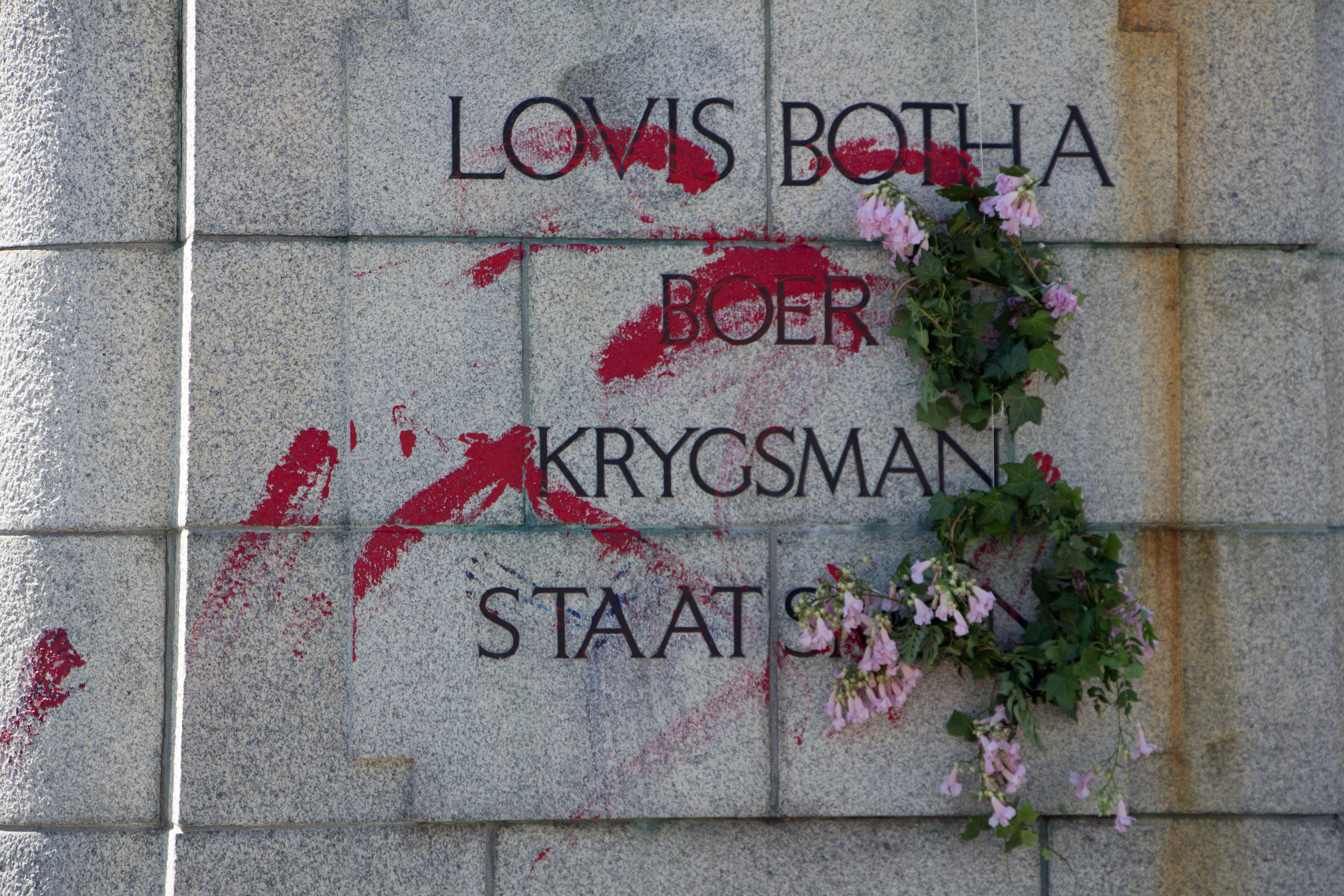
Louis Botha statue, Cape Town

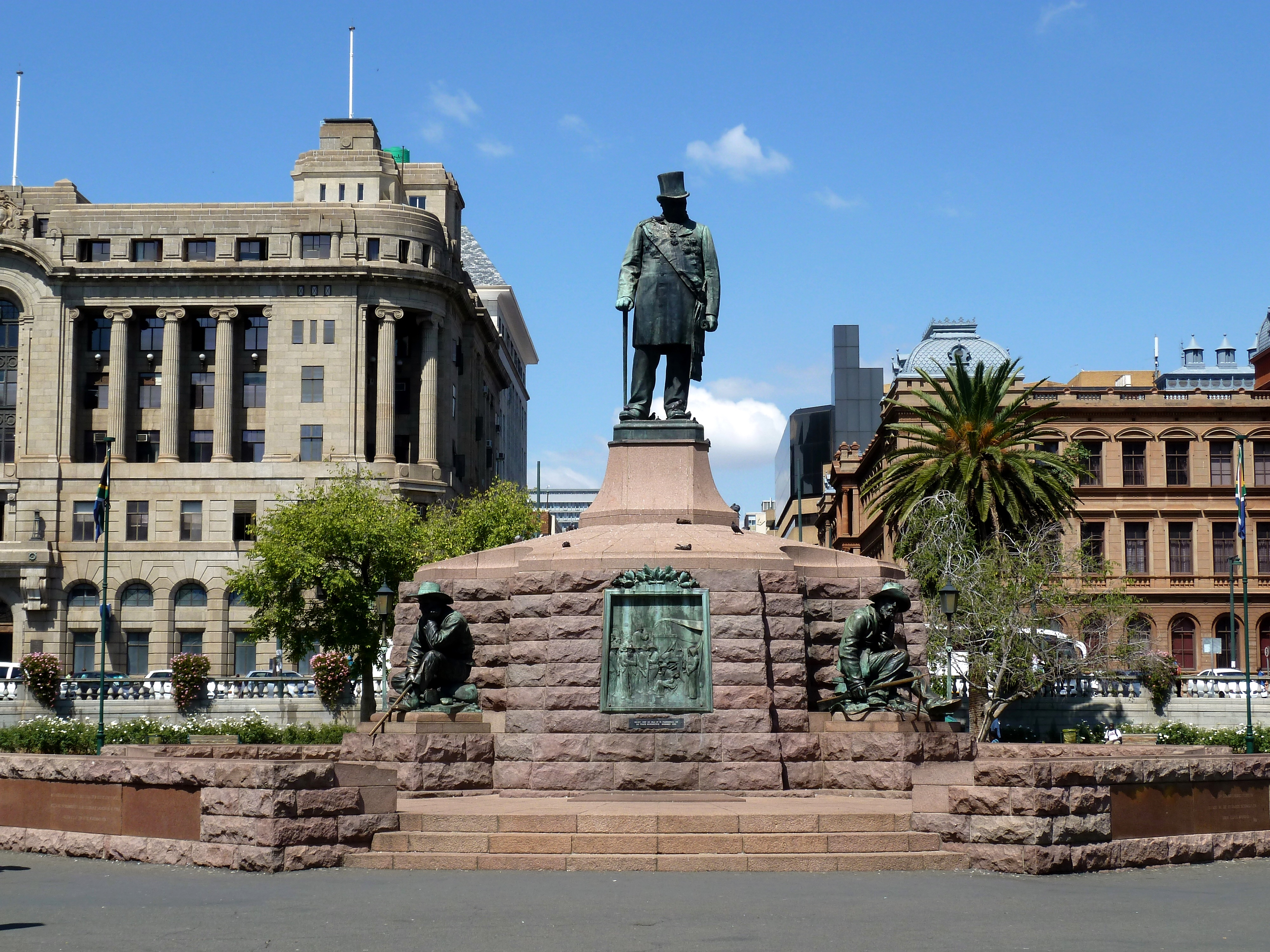
Paul Kruger statue, Pretoria (2013)

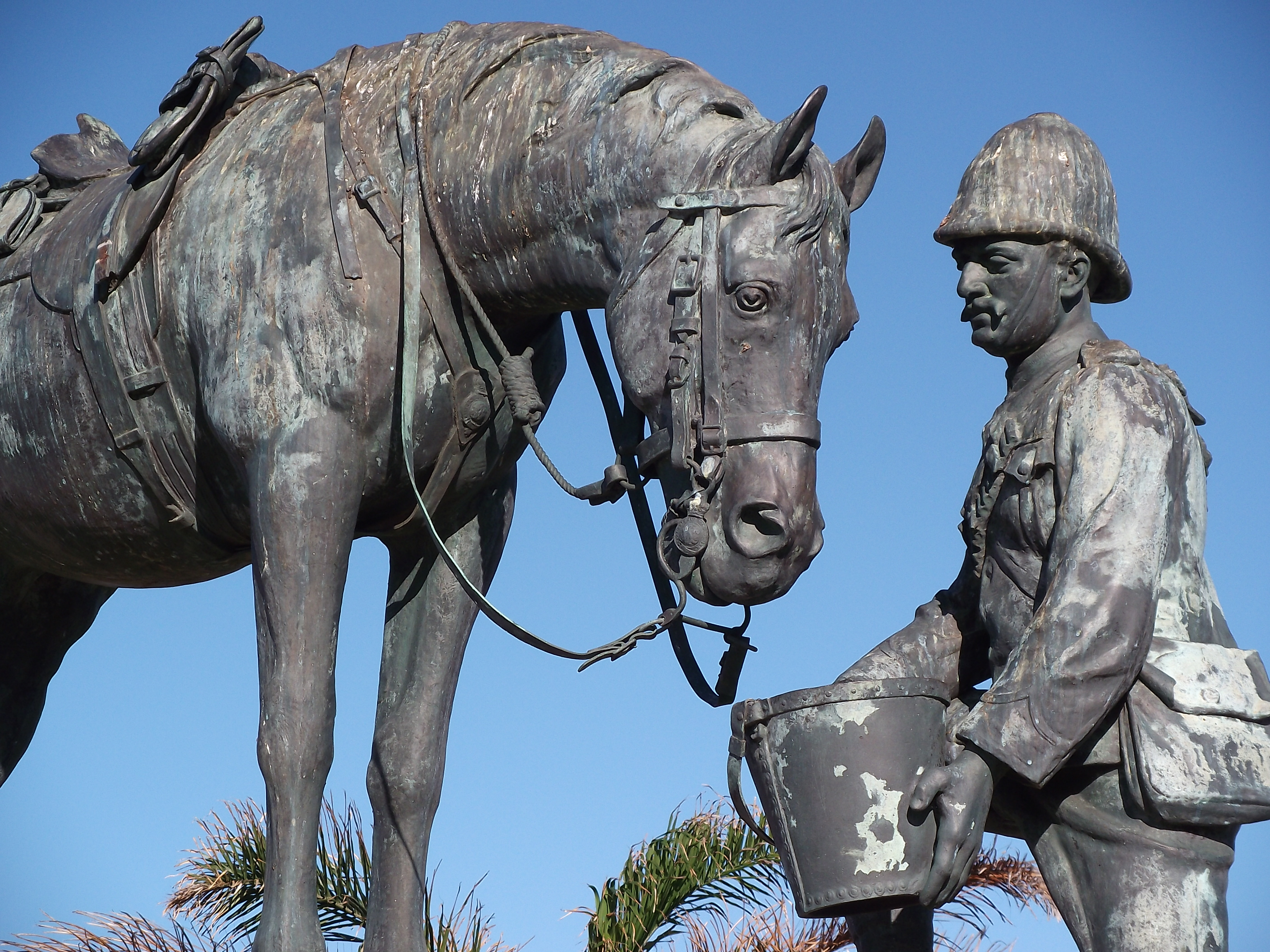
Horse Memorial, Port Elizabeth (2010)

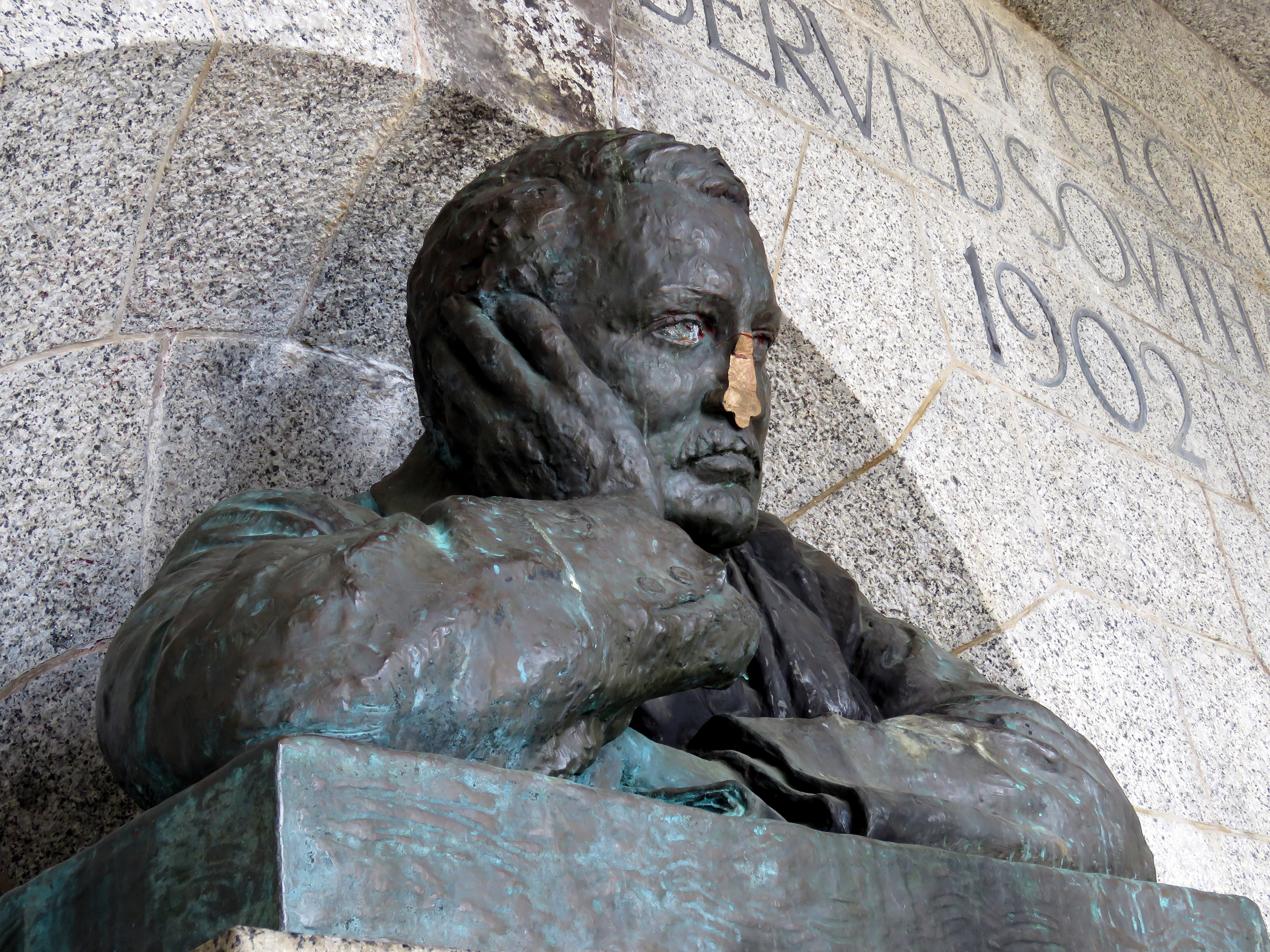
The defaced Rhodes bronze bust at the Rhodes memorial, Cape Town. Note the missing nose. (2015)

== Controversies over Rhodes Scholars who are Rhodes Must Fall activists ==
Ntokozo Qwabe, one of the founders of Rhodes Must Fall and a Rhodes Scholar, was the subject of controversy over seemingly racist comments towards a white waitress in South Africa. For this he was widely criticised in the UK and in South Africa. A few days after the November 2015 Paris attacks Qwabe also caused controversy comparing the French flag to the Nazi flag and calling for it to be banned from universities.

Joshua Nott, a former publicist for Rhodes Must Fall, was accused of hypocrisy, including by Rhodes Must Fall, over subsequently applying for and accepting a Rhodes Scholarship. The Rhodes Trust was criticised for not awarding the scholarship to someone more deserving. Following the completion of his studies at Oxford as a Rhodes Scholar, Nott took up a position of paid employment at the Rhodes Trust. He is employed as 'Associate - Global Partnerships' within the Trust's Rise programme.

== See also ==
- Decolonization of knowledge
- Decommunization in Ukraine
- List of protests in the 21st century
- Occupy movement
- Removal of Confederate monuments and memorials
- Rhodes Memorial
