= The Africa Report =

English-language quarterly magazine

- Editor: Patrick Smith
- Frequency: Quarterly
- Founded: 2005; 20 years ago
- Company: Jeune Afrique Media Group
- Country: France
- Based in: Paris
- Language: English
- Website: www.theafricareport.com
- ISSN: 1950-4810

The Africa Report is a Paris-based English-language quarterly magazine that focuses on African politics and economics.

== History and profile ==
Created in 2005 by Paris-based Jeune Afrique Media Group, The Africa Report is edited by Africa Confidential's Patrick Smith. The company also publishes the monthly magazine Jeune Afrique.

The Africa Report launched a website in 2019. It covers the economic, political, and social news of the continent.

Featuring a report by sector and a focus by country, each issue is produced by an independent editorial team led by Nicholas Norbrook, the managing editor since its creation.

With more than one million readers per month, The Africa Report implemented a paywall on its news website in 2021 to complement its quarterly print edition.

The Africa Report won the 2006, 2007 and 2012 Diageo Africa Business Reporting Award for Best Media as well as the 2007 award for Best Published Feature.

Following the death of the Group's founder Bechir Ben Yahmed on 3 May 2021, the management of The African Report is under supervision of Nicholas Norbroook.
