= Ntokozo Qwabe =

South African Rhodes Scholar (born 1991)

- Born: 1991 (age 34–35); Oyaya, Eshowe, KwaZulu-Natal, South Africa
- Education: University of KwaZulu-Natal; University of Cape Town; Keble College, Oxford
- Known for: Oxford Rhodes Must Fall co-founder

Ntokozo Qwabe (born 1991) is a Rhodes Scholar who was one of the founders of the Rhodes Must Fall campaign at Oxford University. His subsequent comments following the 2015 Paris attacks and behaviour towards a white waitress in South Africa were criticised in news and social media, leading to a petition for his removal from Oxford which was rejected by the university. He has rejected accusations of hypocrisy for receiving money from the Rhodes scholarship scheme, claiming that he is merely recovering wealth stolen from Africans by Rhodes during the colonial period.

== Early life ==
Qwabe was born in 1991 to school caretaker Felokwakhe Qwabe and his wife Nomali in Oyaya, Eshowe, a rural area of KwaZulu-Natal province in South Africa. He is one of 13 children and the first of his family to attend university. He was forced to drop out of the University of KwaZulu-Natal for financial reasons part way through his first degree and work as a cashier at a Checkers store in Rossburgh in order to save for his tuition but returned in 2009 to complete his bachelor of laws degree, graduating summa cum laude in 2013. He subsequently completed a master's degree at the University of Cape Town. He joined the University of Oxford as a Rhodes Scholar in 2014 where he completed a bachelor of civil law (BCL) degree in 2015 at Keble College.

== Rhodes Must Fall ==
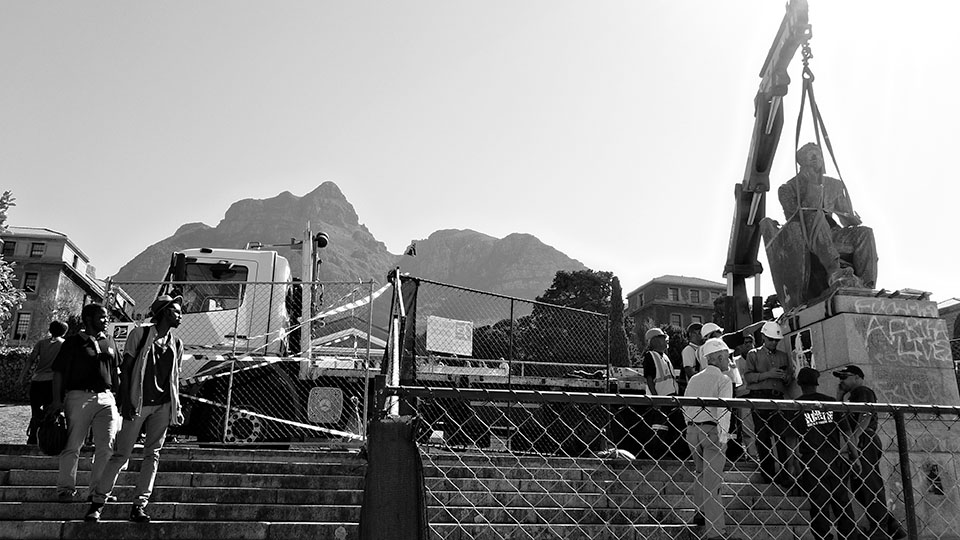
The statue of Cecil Rhodes at the University of Cape Town being removed in April 2015.

In March 2015, Qwabe was one of the founders of the Rhodes Must Fall campaign which originated at the University of Cape Town in South Africa and was originally directed at a statue of Cecil Rhodes that was seen by the campaign as a symbol of European colonialism and white supremacy. The campaign subsequently spread to the University of Oxford and internationally. Qwabe has rejected accusations of hypocrisy for receiving money from the Rhodes scholarship scheme, which is funded by a legacy from Cecil Rhodes, claiming that he is merely recovering wealth stolen from Africans by Rhodes during the colonial period.

== Response to 2015 Paris attacks ==
Two days after the Paris Attacks of November 2015, Qwabe posted a message on Facebook saying he did not stand with France and calling for a ban on the French Tricolour flag at universities, describing it as a symbol of a state "that has for years terrorised – and continues to terrorise – innocent lives in the name of imperialism, colonialism, and other violent barbarities." In a subsequent interview with The Sunday Times, Qwabe compared the French flag to the Nazi swastika.

== Facebook comments and petition for removal from Oxford ==
In May 2016, Qwabe posted comments on Facebook about an incident when he was in a South African restaurant with a friend:

They take a pen & slip in a note where the gratuity/tip amount is supposed to be entered. The note reads in bold: “WE WILL GIVE TIP WHEN YOU RETURN THE LAND”. The waitress comes to us with a card machine for the bill to be sorted out. She sees the note & starts shaking. She leaves us & bursts into typical white tears (like why are you crying when all we’ve done is make a kind request? lol!). Anyways, so this white woman goes to her colleagues who are furious. She exits to cry at the back & a white male colleague of hers reluctantly comes out to address us & to annoy us more with his own white tears telling us that he finds our act "racist".

His actions were widely criticised, including in South Africa where they were described as hypocritical and racist and not supported by an African National Congress spokesman. A petition started by a South African in London to have Qwabe expelled from Oxford University or stripped of his Rhodes scholarship was rejected by the university on the grounds that Qwabe was entitled to free speech. Qwabe has stated that he has no regrets over the comments but that the events were not exactly as he described them on Facebook. A campaign to provide a tip for the waitress raised R150,000.

== 2016 protests at University of Cape Town ==
Qwabe has subsequently been involved in student protests at the University of Cape Town, commenting on Facebook about one incident in which he was accused of violence:

It is NOT true that I 'assaulted' and 'whipped with a stick' a white student during our shutdown of the arrogant UCT Law Faculty yesterday! Although I wish I'd actually not been a good law abiding citizen & whipped the white apartheid settler colonial entitlement out of the bastard - who continued to video record us without our consent - this is not what happened as the media is reporting.

The white student involved later confirmed that he had not been injured but described being racially abused by Qwabe and assaulted by another black student.
