= List of international prime ministerial trips made by Saadeddine Othmani =

This is a list of international prime ministerial trips made by Saadeddine Othmani, who served as the 16th Prime Minister of Morocco from 5 April 2017 to 7 October 2021.

During his premiership, Othmani made 10 trips to 8 countries. The number of visits per country are:

- 2 visits: Brazil and the United States
- 1 visit: Egypt, France, Malaysia, Panama, Russia, and South Korea

== Trips ==
=== 2017 ===
Country	Location(s)	Dates	Details
Malaysia	Sarawak	19–23 November	Attended the 13th World Islamic Economic Forum (WIEF), delivering a speech on Morocco's economic reforms and development plans. This was Othmani's first official trip abroad since taking office as Prime Minister on 5 April 2017.

=== 2018 ===
Country	Location(s)	Dates	Details
Brazil	Brasília	19 March	Chaired the Moroccan delegation to the 8th World Water Forum, participating in the opening ceremony and holding a bilateral audience with Brazilian President Michel Temer.
Russia	Moscow	20 May	Visited the Moroccan embassy in Moscow ahead of the 2018 FIFA World Cup.
South Korea	Seoul; Busan	21 May	Discussed reinforcing political and business ties between Morocco and South Korea.
United States	New York City	24–26 September	Attended the general debate of the 73rd session of the United Nations General Assembly.

=== 2019 ===
Country	Location(s)	Dates	Details
Brazil	Brasília	1 January	Represented King Mohammed VI at the inauguration of Brazilian President Jair Bolsonaro.
Egypt	Sharm El Sheikh	23–25 February	Headed the Moroccan delegation to the first Arab–European Union summit.
Panama	Panama City	30 June	Attended the inauguration of Panamanian President Laurentino Cortizo. On arrival at Tocumen International Airport he was received by Deputy Foreign Minister Luis Miguel Hincapié. Othmani said the trip was part of Morocco's efforts to secure international support for its position on the Western Sahara.
United States	New York City	24–30 September	Attended the general debate of the 74th session of the United Nations General Assembly.
France	Paris	19 December	Led a Moroccan delegation for meetings with French officials.

=== 2020–2021 ===
No international trips were made in 2020 or 2021 due to the COVID-19 pandemic.

== See also ==
- Foreign relations of Morocco
- List of international prime ministerial trips made by Aziz Akhannouch, his successor
