= Chumani Maxwele =

South African political activist (born 1985)

- Born: 1985 (age 40–41); Mthatha, Eastern Cape, South Africa
- Known for: Rhodes Must Fall protest

Chumani Maxwele (born 1985) is a South African political activist best known for his involvement in the Rhodes Must Fall and the #FeesMustFall movements. Maxwele first gained prominence in 2010 after his wrongful arrest and interrogation for allegedly giving an obscene hand gesture to President Jacob Zuma's presidential motorcade convoy in Cape Town city traffic.

In December 2022 it was reported that Maxwele physically assaulted a University of Cape Town academic at a university function. He had previously been expelled from the university, a decision upheld by court in 2019.

== Early years ==
Maxwele spent most of his early years in a village in the Eastern Cape region of South Africa. His mother was a domestic worker and his father was a miner. Two years after South Africa's first democratic elections in 1994 he moved to the Cape Town township of Delft where he spent time volunteering for an HIV awareness campaign in nearby Khayelitsha. He gained a scholarship to study Political Science at the University of Cape Town (UCT).

== Presidential hand gesture ==
On 10 February 2010 Maxwele was arrested and detained in Cape Town by members of the president's bodyguard for allegedly giving the finger to the South African presidential motorcade. Following on this incident, the FW de Klerk Foundation's Centre for Constitutional Rights lodged a complaint with the South African Human Rights Commission, arguing that members of the Presidential Special Protection Unit violated Maxwele's human rights as enshrined in the South African Constitution.

Following an investigation, the Commission found that the following among Maxwele's rights had been violated during his wrongful arrest: Human Dignity (Section 10); Freedom and Security of the Person (Section 12); Privacy (Section 14); Freedom of Expression and peaceful/unarmed demonstration (Sections 16 & 17); Political Choice (Section 19) and the Rights of Detained Persons (Section 35).

== Rhodes Must Fall & #FeesMustFall ==
In March 2015 Maxwele ignited a vigorous national debate about post-apartheid racial transformation by hurling human excrement at a prominent statue of Cecil John Rhodes on the University of Cape Town's Rondebosch campus, a result of which some media started referring to Maxwele as 'poo-flinger'. He was subsequently an active member of the Rhodes Must Fall protest movement, before being suspended by the university after alleged abuse of a UCT staff member.

In October 2015, Maxwele was involved in a nationwide protest against rising costs of attending university otherwise known as the #FeesMustFall movement, during which he was arrested outside Parliament. The case is to be heard in February 2016.

In April 2016, Maxwele was again involved in violent protests during an illegal #FeesMustFall protest taking place at the University of the Witwatersrand. During the protest, a lecture hall at the university was set on fire.

On 7 May 2015, Chumani Maxwele was given a provisional suspension order because UCT authorities "considered his continued presence on the campus as being a threat to the maintenance of good order."

The suspension related to an incident which is alleged to have occurred on 1 May 2015. Upon appeal by Maxwele, UCT varied the suspension to allow him to attend classes and use the library. Maxwele successfully challenged his suspension in the Western Cape High Court on the grounds that the presence of the deputy registrar of academic administration, Karen van Heerden, at his suspension hearing tainted the hearing with bias.

UCT spokesperson Patricia Lucas said while the university would abide by the court's findings, its decision did not interfere with UCT's disciplinary process and that disciplinary action in connection with the incident on 1 May 2015 would go ahead. Maxwele had previously failed to attend a disciplinary hearing scheduled for 4 and 5 June 2015 after submitting a medical certificate indicating that he was unwell. The final disciplinary action taken against Maxwele by UCT was his expulsion. This decision followed a series of disciplinary hearings that began in December 2017, where Maxwele was convicted on four counts, including intimidation and racial abuse of staff members in incidents from 2015, as well as unauthorized access to a computer lab and verbal abuse earlier that year.

The expulsion, imposed on September 5, 2018, ended his postgraduate studies at UCT. His appeal against the conviction and expulsion was dismissed by the UCT Student Discipline Tribunal of Appeal on October 9, 2019.
