= Africa CEO Forum =

African organisation

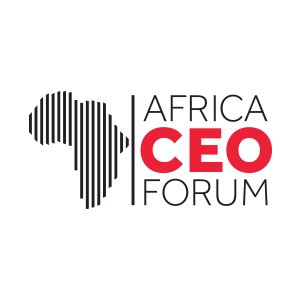
- Formation: 2012; 13 years ago
- Owner: Jeune Afrique Media Group
- Website: www.theafricaceoforum.com

The Africa CEO Forum is a company created and owned by Jeune Afrique Media Group. With the IFC, it co-organizes an event dedicated to African private sector actors, reportedly the largest annual gathering of African private-sector leaders, — drawing political and economic leaders from throughout the continent.

Considered as the "Davos of Africa," the Africa CEO Forum has been bringing together business leaders, investors, policy makers and journalists of all countries every year since 2012.

== Events ==
=== 2012 ===
Billed as "As the first international event of its kind," the first Forum, in 2012, gathered company chief executives, investors, financial decision-makers, and public officials (reportedly 500 attendees, including 300 African company directors and 100 financiers.) to:

- "Support the development of African businesses and contribute to their international promotion," and
- "Facilitate dialogue between the private and public sectors to improve the business environment in Africa."

The event included presentations and discussions by African leaders, and business-to-business meetings.

=== Since 2020 ===
The Africa CEO Forum also produces geographic and sectoral events as well as a virtual variation of its event concepts since 2020.

=== 2023 ===
The 2023 Africa CEO Forum — held in Abidjan, Ivory Coast, and opened by Ivorian president Alassane Outtara and the CEO of the World Bank's International Finance Corporation (IFC) — drew over 1,800 people (including hundreds of company directors) from 70 countries (including 41 African countries).

Presenters included the Prime Ministers of Ivory Coast (Patrick Achi) and Morocco (Aziz Akhannouch). Other dignitaries included the Prime Ministers of Cameroon (Joseph Dion Ngute), Gabon (Alain Claude Bilie By Nze), and Sao Tome and Principe (Patrice Trovoada).

The event primarily focused on how to assure and accelerate the emergence of the next generation of "African champions," despite current crises (including post-COVID-19 supply chain and logistics problems, and the Africa-wide food crisis resulting from the Russian invasion of Ukraine).

Additional attention was given to the potential for African digital evolution, particularly in concert with emerging opportunities for an African competitive edge in alternative sourcing across industries and supply chains. Another topic of interest was ensuring that Africa’s trillion-dollar carbon-offset market benefits Africans.
