= Jeune Afrique =

French Africa-focused news magazine

- Editor: Danielle Ben Yahmed
- Categories: News magazine
- Frequency: Monthly
- Total circulation: 36,319 (2020)
- Founder: Béchir Ben Yahmed
- Founded: 17 October 1960; 65 years ago
- Company: Jeune Afrique Media Group
- Country: France
- Based in: Paris
- Language: French
- Website: www.jeuneafrique.com
- ISSN: 1950-1285

Jeune Afrique (English: Young Africa) is a French-language pan-African weekly news magazine, founded in 1960 in Tunis and subsequently published in Paris by Jeune Afrique Media Group. It is the most widely read pan-African magazine. It offers coverage of African and international political, economic and cultural news. It is also a book publisher, under the imprint "Les Éditions du Jaguar".

Starting in 1997, Jeune Afrique has also maintained a news website.

Published on a weekly basis for its first sixty years, it has been published monthly since 2020.

== History and profile ==
Jeune Afrique was co-founded by Béchir Ben Yahmed, then minister of information of Tunisian President Habib Bourguiba, and other Tunisian intellectuals in Tunis on 17 October 1960. The founders of the weekly moved to Paris due to strict censorship imposed during the presidency of Habib Bourgiba. The magazine covers African political, economic and cultural spheres, with an emphasis on Francophone Africa and the Maghreb.

Jeune Afrique covered the emerging fedayeen movement of the Palestine Liberation Organization immediately after the 1967 war between the Arab states and Israel. The magazine published an interview with Yasser Arafat in May 1968.

From 2000 (issue 2040) to early 2006 (issue 2354), the magazine went by the name of Jeune Afrique L'intelligent.

Jeune Afrique is published by Jeune Afrique Media Group, which also publishes the monthly English-language news magazine The Africa Report.

The headquarters of the magazine in Paris has been attacked in France twice, once in 1986, and again in 1987. Responsibility for the latter attack was claimed by the French nationalist Charles Martel Group.

The magazine has an edition published for Tunisia, which has been suspended several times for covering sensitive news concerning the country. From July 1984 to January 1985 it was banned in the country. In June 1989, the magazine was also banned in Morocco. During this period, it had a circulation of around 13,000 copies in the country.

The COVID-19 crisis and the print media situation in France has led to the ongoing digitalization of Jeune Afrique. In early December 2020, Jeune Afrique's management announced the first redundancy plan in its history due to declining economic results caused by the COVID-19 pandemic.

In September 2023, sale of Jeune Afrique was banned in Burkina Faso, when the country's military government took offence at articles alleging tensions in the Burkina Faso Armed Forces.

On 8 May 2026, the National Communication Observatory in Niger suspended Jeune Afrique due to its "repeated dissemination of content likely to seriously undermine public order, national unity, social cohesion, and the stability of republican institutions". The decision was criticised by the Committee to Protect Journalists as "censorship".

== Management ==
- Amir Ben Yahmed, CEO
- Danielle Ben Yahmed, vice president
- François Soudan, vice president & managing editor
- Marwane Ben Yahmed, director of publication
- Mamadou Goundiam, executive director
