= Béchir Ben Yahmed =

Tunisian-French journalist (1928–2021)

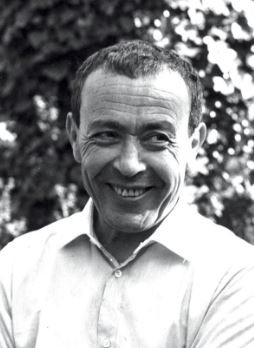
- Yahmed in 1984
- Born: 2 April 1928; Djerba, French Tunisia
- Died: 3 May 2021 (aged 93); Paris, France
- Education: HEC Paris
- Occupation: Journalist

Béchir Ben Yahmed (Arabic: البشير بن يحمد) (2 April 1928 – 3 May 2021) was a Tunisian-French journalist. He founded the weekly news magazine Jeune Afrique and served as its CEO. He also founded the newspaper La Revue.

== Biography ==
The son of a trader, Ben Yahmed was born in Djerba in 1928. After earning a diploma from HEC Paris, he served on a Tunisian delegation for autonomy and negotiation on independence. In April 1955, he founded the weekly newspaper L'Action, which closed in September 1958. On 15 April 1956, he was nominated to be Secretary of State of Information in the cabinet of Prime Minister Habib Bourguiba. He never sat on the Tunisian Constituent Assembly due to the fact that he did not meet the age requirement.

After Bourguiba became President of Tunisia, Ben Yahmed resigned from government. On 17 October 1960, he founded Afrique Action. He then founded Jeune Afrique on 21 November 1961. In May 1962, he emigrated to Rome and subsequently Paris in 1964. On 2 April 1969, he married his wife, Danielle, in Rome, with whom he had two sons: Marwane and Amir. Their sons served in executive positions at Jeune Afrique.

Relations between Ben Yahmed and Tunisian President Zine El Abidine Ben Ali were very good. President Ben Ali saved Jeune Afrique by injecting millions of Tunisian dinars into the company. Satirical newspaper Le Canard enchaîné reported that "helping Jeune Afrique is not a wish, it is a presidential instruction", referring to the financial operation to save the magazine.

Ben Yahmed served as CEO of Jeune Afrique until 14 October 2007, when he was succeeded by François Soudan. By then, the magazine had been a well-established source of information on the entire African continent. He had also founded Éditions du Jaguar and La Revue.

Béchir Ben Yahmed died of COVID-19 at Lariboisière Hospital in Paris on 3 May 2021, at the age of 93.

== Publications ==
- Ce que je crois, tome 1 : Les années d'espoir 1960-1979 (1998)
- Ce que je crois, tome 2 : Face aux crises 1980-1996 (1998)
- Ce que je crois, chroniques 2001 (2002)
- Ce que je crois, chroniques 2002 (2003)
