= National Register of Historic Places listings in Boulder County, Colorado =

Location of Boulder County in Colorado

This is a list of the National Register of Historic Places listings in Boulder County, Colorado.

This is intended to be a complete list of the properties and districts on the National Register of Historic Places in Boulder County, Colorado, United States. The locations of National Register properties and districts for which the latitude and longitude coordinates are included below, may be seen in a map.

There are 90 properties and districts listed on the National Register in the county, including 2 National Historic Landmarks. Another two properties were once listed but have been removed.

This National Park Service list is complete through NPS recent listings posted August 28, 2026.

== Current listings ==
	Name on the Register	Image	Date listed	Location	City or town	Description
1	Arnett-Fullen House	Arnett-Fullen House	January 29, 2009 (#08001376)	646 Pearl St. 40°00′58″N 105°17′12″W	Boulder	Commonly referred to as the Gingerbread House.
2	Hannah Barker House	Hannah Barker House	September 12, 2019 (#100004376)	800 Arapahoe Ave. 40°00′46″N 105°17′05″W	Boulder	
3	Boulder County Courthouse	Boulder County Courthouse	December 13, 2024 (#100011355)	1300/1325 Pearl Street; 40°01′06″N 105°16′41″W	Boulder	
4	Boulder County Poor Farm	Boulder County Poor Farm	September 13, 2001 (#01000969)	63rd St. near its junction with Jay Rd. 40°02′44″N 105°12′23″W	Boulder	
5	Boulder Creek Bridge	Boulder Creek Bridge	March 11, 2003 (#03000103)	State Highway 119 at milepost 39.13; 40°00′53″N 105°19′16″W	Boulder	Concrete slab and beam bridge built in 1953, one of first in state having parabolically arched beams rather than flat ones.
6	Boulder Valley Grange No. 131	Boulder Valley Grange No. 131	December 7, 1987 (#87002009)	3400 N. 95th St. 40°02′13″N 105°07′48″W	Lafayette	
7	Buchan Cabin		September 3, 2020 (#100005521)	2386 Cty. Rd. 111; 39°58′02″N 105°36′09″W	Eldora vicinity	
8	Bunce School	Bunce School	May 22, 1986 (#86001109)	State Highway 7 south of Allenspark; 40°10′23″N 105°28′09″W	Allenspark	Log one-room schoolhouse built in 1888.
9	T.M. Callahan House	T.M. Callahan House	May 16, 1985 (#85001064)	312 Terry St. 40°09′52″N 105°06′17″W	Longmont	1892-built Queen Anne-style brick house
10	Cardinal Mill	Cardinal Mill	December 22, 2011 (#11000945)	Along Coon Track Creek at Cardinal; 39°58′08″N 105°33′00″W	Nederland	
11	Carnegie Library	Carnegie Library	February 16, 1979 (#79000573)	1125 Pine St. 40°01′12″N 105°16′52″W	Boulder	
12	Chautauqua Auditorium	Chautauqua Auditorium	January 21, 1974 (#74000562)	Chautauqua Park; 39°59′51″N 105°16′47″W	Boulder	
13	Church of the Brethren	Church of the Brethren	January 5, 1984 (#84000794)	17th Ave. 40°11′19″N 105°10′06″W	Hygiene	
14	Colorado Chautauqua	Colorado Chautauqua	March 21, 1978 (#78000830)	900 Baseline Rd., Chautauqua Park; 39°59′52″N 105°16′50″W	Boulder	
15	Columbia Cemetery	Columbia Cemetery	August 1, 1997 (#97000792)	Along 9th St., bounded by Pleasant and College Aves. 40°00′30″N 105°16′58″W	Boulder	
16	Congregational Church	Congregational Church	May 20, 1983 (#83001298)	300 E. Simpson St. 39°59′53″N 105°05′15″W	Lafayette	
17	Denver Elevator-Grain Elevator	Denver Elevator-Grain Elevator	February 14, 1986 (#86000212)	Tract 712 near State Highway 42; 39°58′36″N 105°07′45″W	Louisville	Commonly referred to as Louisville Grain Elevator
18	Denver, Boulder and Western Railway Historic District	Denver, Boulder and Western Railway Historic District	September 18, 1980 (#80000882)	State Highway 72; 40°00′27″N 105°29′58″W	Ward	Also known as the Switzerland Trail.
19	Denver, Northwestern and Pacific Railway Historic District	Denver, Northwestern and Pacific Railway Historic District	September 30, 1980 (#80000881)	Southwest of Eldora; 39°54′52″N 105°41′10″W	Eldora	Historic railroad route over Rollins Pass; extends into Gilpin and Grand counties.
20	Dickens Opera House	Dickens Opera House	July 28, 1987 (#87000702)	300 Main St. 40°09′52″N 105°06′06″W	Longmont	
21	Downtown Boulder Historic District	Downtown Boulder Historic District	December 3, 1980 (#80000878)	State Highway 119; 40°01′07″N 105°16′43″W	Boulder	
22	Downtown Longmont Historic District	Downtown Longmont Historic District	August 28, 2017 (#100001501)	Roughly Main, Coffman & Kimbark Sts. between 3rd & 5th Aves. 40°09′57″N 105°06′09″W	Longmont	
23	East Longs Peak Trail	East Longs Peak Trail	July 10, 2007 (#07000740)	West of State Highway 7; 40°16′20″N 105°36′02″W	Allenspark	Extends into Larimer County.
24	East Side Historic District	East Side Historic District	October 2, 1986 (#86002812)	Roughly bounded by Long's Peak Ave., Collyer St., Fourth Ave., and Emery St. 40°10′00″N 105°05′56″W	Longmont	
25	Eldora Historic District	Eldora Historic District	October 4, 1989 (#89000978)	Roughly Eaton Pl., 6th, Pearl, and 4th Sts., Huron Ave., 6th St., Eldorado Ave., and 7th St., Klondyke Ave., and 10th St. 39°57′01″N 105°34′17″W	Eldora	
26	Empson Cannery	Empson Cannery	January 5, 1984 (#84000796)	15 3rd Ave. 40°09′49″N 105°05′37″W	Longmont	
27	First Baptist Church of Boulder	First Baptist Church of Boulder	April 14, 2004 (#04000275)	1237 Pine St. 40°01′13″N 105°16′45″W	Boulder	
28	First Congregational Church of Lyons	First Congregational Church of Lyons	December 12, 1976 (#76000547)	High and 4th Sts. 40°13′33″N 105°16′11″W	Lyons	
29	Fox Mine Office	Fox Mine Office	February 23, 1996 (#96000168)	1226 S. Cherryvale Rd. 39°58′06″N 105°12′51″W	Boulder	
30	Fox Stone Barn	Fox Stone Barn	February 16, 1996 (#96000070)	S. Cherryvale Rd., 0.5 miles south of U.S. Highway 36; 39°58′10″N 105°12′46″W	Boulder	
31	Ginacci House	Ginacci House	February 14, 1986 (#86000213)	1116 LaFarge St. 39°58′52″N 105°07′57″W	Louisville	
32	Gold Hill Historic District	Gold Hill Historic District	August 3, 1989 (#89000979)	Roughly bounded by North St., Pine St., Boulder St., Gold Run St., and College St. 40°03′43″N 105°24′26″W	Gold Hill	
33	Gold Miner Hotel	Gold Miner Hotel	July 3, 1997 (#97000657)	601 Klondyke Ave. 39°57′01″N 105°34′10″W	Eldora	
34	Highland School	Highland School	December 18, 1978 (#78000831)	885 Arapahoe Ave. 40°00′48″N 105°17′01″W	Boulder	
35	David Hull Holmes House	David Hull Holmes House	December 3, 2018 (#100003225)	720 11th St. 40°00′01″N 105°16′43″W	Boulder	
36	Hotel Boulderado	Hotel Boulderado	November 3, 1994 (#94001226)	2115 13th St. 40°01′09″N 105°16′43″W	Boulder	
37	Hoverhome and Hover Farmstead	Hoverhome and Hover Farmstead	January 15, 1999 (#98001555)	1303-1309 Hover Rd. 40°10′55″N 105°07′53″W	Longmont	
38	Jacoe Store	Jacoe Store	February 14, 1986 (#86000215)	1001 Main St. 39°58′47″N 105°07′53″W	Louisville	
39	Jamestown Mercantile Building	Jamestown Mercantile Building	August 3, 1989 (#89000985)	Main St. 40°06′57″N 105°23′18″W	Jamestown	
40	Jamestown Town Hall	Jamestown Town Hall	July 10, 2003 (#03000615)	118 Main St. 40°06′58″N 105°23′15″W	Jamestown	
41	Kullgren House	Kullgren House	May 20, 1983 (#83001299)	209 E. Cleveland St. 39°59′51″N 105°05′17″W	Lafayette	
42	Lackner's Tavern	Lackner's Tavern	February 14, 1986 (#86000220)	1006 Pine; 39°58′31″N 105°07′45″W	Louisville	
43	Lafayette House	Lafayette House	May 20, 1983 (#83001300)	600 E. Simpson St. 39°59′53″N 105°05′01″W	Lafayette	
44	LaSalla House	LaSalla House	February 14, 1986 (#86000217)	1124 Main St. 39°58′53″N 105°07′52″W	Louisville	
45	Lewis House	Lewis House	May 20, 1983 (#83001301)	108 E. Simpson St. 39°59′53″N 105°05′21″W	Lafayette	Home of the Lafayette History Museum
46	Little Church in the Pines	Little Church in the Pines	August 3, 1989 (#89000983)	414 Gold Run Rd. 40°03′12″N 105°22′33″W	Salina	
47	Longhurst Lodge		September 18, 2017 (#100001606)	State Highway 7 and County Road 82, Arapaho-Roosevelt National Forest and Pawnee National Grassland; 40°15′33″N 105°32′13″W	Allenspark	
48	Longmont Carnegie Library	Longmont Carnegie Library	November 3, 1992 (#92001406)	457 4th Ave. 40°09′56″N 105°06′01″W	Longmont	
49	Longmont College	Longmont College	August 12, 1987 (#87001285)	546 Atwood St. 40°10′08″N 105°05′45″W	Longmont	
50	Longmont Fire Department	Longmont Fire Department	May 16, 1985 (#85001063)	667 4th Ave. 40°09′56″N 105°06′10″W	Longmont	
51	Longmont Power Plant		September 10, 1987 (#87001553)	Old Apple Valley Rd. 40°14′01″N 105°17′38″W	Lyons	
52	Lyons Railroad Depot	Lyons Railroad Depot	December 2, 1974 (#74000563)	400 block of Broadway; 40°13′27″N 105°16′14″W	Lyons	
53	Lyons Sandstone Buildings	Lyons Sandstone Buildings	April 29, 1980 (#80000880)	U.S. Highway 36 and State Highway 7; 40°13′05″N 105°15′16″W	Lyons	
54	McKenzie Well	McKenzie Well	January 26, 2005 (#04001553)	Near Independence Rd. and State Highway 119; 40°02′36″N 105°14′27″W	Boulder	
55	Miller House	Miller House	May 20, 1983 (#83001291)	409 E. Cleveland St. 39°59′51″N 105°05′08″W	Lafayette	
56	Modoc Mill		December 27, 1978 (#78000833)	North of Ward; 40°04′50″N 105°30′39″W	Ward	
57	Mount St. Gertrude Academy	Mount St. Gertrude Academy	November 3, 1994 (#94001227)	970 Aurora St. 40°00′13″N 105°16′51″W	Boulder	
58	National Fuel Company Store	National Fuel Company Store	February 14, 1986 (#86000222)	801 Main St. 39°58′09″N 105°07′53″W	Louisville	
59	Norlin Quadrangle Historic District	Norlin Quadrangle Historic District	March 27, 1980 (#80000879)	University of Colorado campus 40°00′32″N 105°16′20″W	Boulder	
60	North St. Vrain Creek Bridge	North St. Vrain Creek Bridge	October 15, 2002 (#02001159)	State Highway 7 at milepost 32.98, over the North St. Vrain Creek; 40°13′22″N 105°16′18″W	Lyons	Single-span bridge built in 1955
61	Northern Colorado Power Company Substation	Northern Colorado Power Company Substation	May 22, 1986 (#86001108)	1590 Broadway; 40°00′40″N 105°16′36″W	Boulder	
62	Petrelli-DelPizzo House	Petrelli-DelPizzo House	February 14, 1986 (#86000224)	1016 Main St. 39°58′48″N 105°07′52″W	Louisville	
63	Rhoades House	Rhoades House	February 14, 1986 (#86000226)	1024 Grant; 39°58′49″N 105°08′06″W	Louisville	
64	Robinson House	Robinson House	February 14, 1986 (#86000228)	301 Spruce; 39°58′41″N 105°08′20″W	Louisville	House built in 1904
65	Rock Creek Farm Rural Historic District	Rock Creek Farm Rural Historic District	April 20, 2023 (#100007966)	2005 South 112th St. 39°57′01″N 105°05′35″W	Broomfield vicinity	
66	Rocky Mountain Mammoth Mine	Rocky Mountain Mammoth Mine	July 6, 2010 (#10000422)	4879 Magnolia Dr. 39°59′08″N 105°24′01″W	Nederland	
67	St. Stephen's Episcopal Church, 1881	St. Stephen's Episcopal Church, 1881	February 24, 1975 (#75000501)	470 Main St. 40°10′03″N 105°06′06″W	Longmont	
68	Salina School	Salina School	August 3, 1989 (#89000984)	536 Gold Run Rd. 40°03′15″N 105°22′37″W	Salina	
69	Sandbeach Lake Trail		January 29, 2008 (#07001471)	South of Lookout Mountain; 40°13′14″N 105°32′12″W	Meeker Park	
70	Shannon Farm	Shannon Farm	October 17, 2003 (#03001047)	1341 N. 95th St. 40°00′39″N 105°07′51″W	Lafayette	
71	Squires-Tourtellot House	Squires-Tourtellot House	August 10, 1978 (#78000832)	1019 Spruce St. 40°01′07″N 105°16′55″W	Boulder	
72	Stolmes House	Stolmes House	February 14, 1986 (#86000229)	616 Front St. 39°58′35″N 105°07′47″W	Louisville	
73	Sunshine School	Sunshine School	July 27, 1989 (#89000982)	355 County Road 83; 40°03′42″N 105°21′54″W	Sunshine	
74	Swedish Evangelical Lutheran Church of Ryssby	Swedish Evangelical Lutheran Church of Ryssby	February 16, 1984 (#84000797)	N. 63rd St. 40°08′23″N 105°12′20″W	Boulder	
75	Tego Brothers Drugstore-State National Bank of Louisville	Tego Brothers Drugstore-State National Bank of Louisville	February 14, 1986 (#86000230)	700 Main St. 39°58′37″N 105°07′51″W	Louisville	
76	The Terrace	The Terrace	November 3, 1987 (#87001287)	207 E. Cleveland St. 39°59′54″N 105°05′17″W	Lafayette	
77	Thomas House	Thomas House	February 14, 1986 (#86000231)	700 Lincoln; 39°58′40″N 105°08′09″W	Louisville	
78	Thunder Lake Patrol Cabin	Thunder Lake Patrol Cabin	January 29, 1988 (#87001124)	Thunder Lake; 40°13′20″N 105°38′39″W	Estes Park	In Rocky Mountain National Park
79	Thunder Lake Trail-Bluebird Lake Trail		January 29, 2008 (#07001472)	Roughly along the North St. Vrain Creek, west of Wild Basin Ranger Station; 40°11′34″N 105°39′07″W	Allenspark	
80	Tower of Compassion		May 6, 2025 (#100011790)	1151 S. Pratt Parkway; 40°08′41″N 105°06′26″W	Longmont	
81	US Post Office-Boulder Main	US Post Office-Boulder Main	January 22, 1986 (#86000164)	1905 15th St. 40°01′42″N 105°16′31″W	Boulder	
82	Walker Ranch Historic District	Walker Ranch Historic District	June 14, 1984 (#84000798)	West of Boulder; also 7.5 miles west of Boulder off Flagstaff Rd. 39°57′14″N 105°20′03″W	Boulder	Second location represents a boundary increase
83	Wall Street Assay Office	Wall Street Assay Office	August 3, 1989 (#89000986)	6352 Four Mile Canyon Dr. 40°02′24″N 105°23′21″W	Wallstreet	Assay Office for the Storm King Mine located in Wall Street, CO
84	Ward Congregational Church	Ward Congregational Church	August 3, 1989 (#89000981)	41 Modoc; 40°04′22″N 105°30′29″W	Ward	
85	Ward School	Ward School	August 3, 1989 (#89000980)	66 Columbia; 40°04′18″N 105°30′30″W	Ward	School built in 1898, now a post office
86	Martha Weiser House	Martha Weiser House	October 16, 2013 (#13000825)	4020 N. 75th St. 40°03′11″N 105°10′42″W	Boulder	
87	West Side Historic District	West Side Historic District	January 7, 1987 (#86002846)	Roughly bounded by 5th, Terry, 3rd, and Grant; 40°09′57″N 105°06′32″W	Longmont	
88	Wild Basin House	Wild Basin House	January 29, 1988 (#87001125)	Wild Basin; 40°12′29″N 105°33′56″W	Estes Park	
89	Wild Basin Ranger Station and House	Wild Basin Ranger Station and House	January 29, 1988 (#87001126)	Wild Basin; 40°12′32″N 105°33′55″W	Estes Park	
90	Woodward-Baird House	Woodward-Baird House	February 15, 1979 (#79000574)	1733 Canyon Boulevard; 40°01′03″N 105°16′16″W	Boulder	

== Former listings ==
	Name on the Register	Image	Date listed	Date removed	Location	City or town	Description
1	Snowbound Mine	Snowbound Mine	August 3, 1989 (#89000998)	July 11, 2016	County Road 52; 40°04′19″N 105°23′01″W	Gold Hill	Burned down September 6, 2010
2	Wilbur Williams House	Wilbur Williams House	June 3, 1982 (#82002286)	October 18, 1988	1434 Baseline Rd.	Boulder	Removed from Register due to extensive alterations

== See also ==
- List of National Historic Landmarks in Colorado
- List of National Register of Historic Places in Colorado
- Bibliography of Colorado
- Geography of Colorado
- History of Colorado
- Index of Colorado-related articles
- List of Colorado-related lists
- Outline of Colorado
