= Boulder Creek Bridge =

Boulder Creek Bridge may refer to:

- Boulder Creek Bridge (Tortilla Flat, Arizona), listed on the National Register of Historic Places in Maricopa County, Arizona
- Boulder Creek Bridge (Boulder, Colorado), listed on the National Register of Historic Places in Boulder County, Colorado
