= Bunce School =

- U.S. National Register of Historic Places
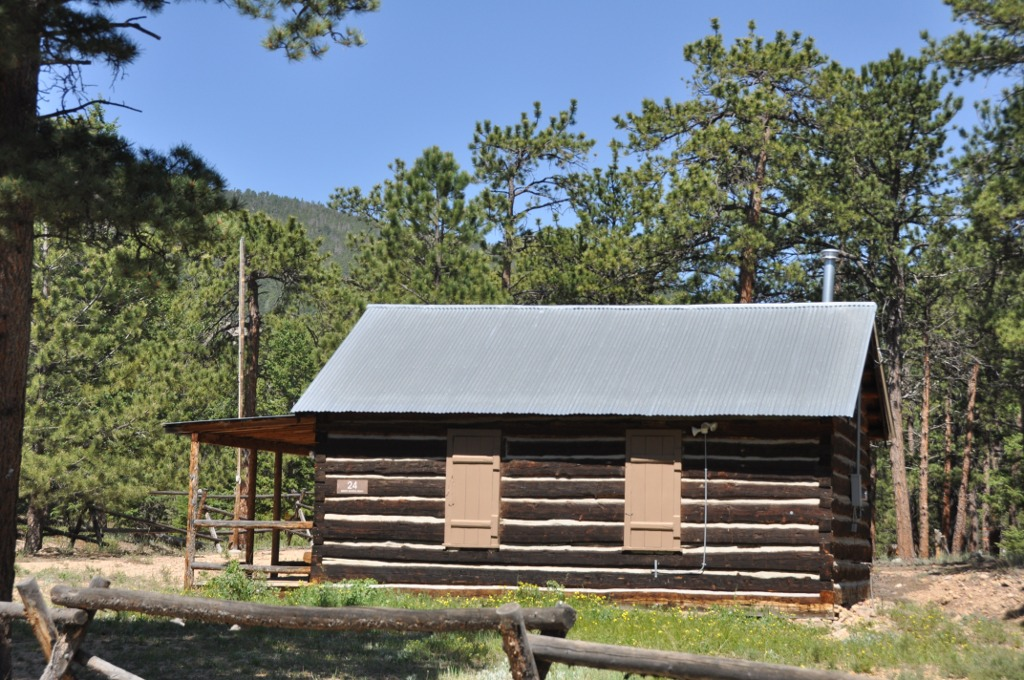

- Location within Colorado
- Location: CO 7 south of Allenspark, Allenspark, Colorado
- Coordinates: 40.17292°N 105.46905°W
- Area: less than one acre
- Built: 1888
- Built by: V.H. Rowley and J.H. Bunce
- NRHP reference No.: 86001109
- Added to NRHP: May 22, 1986

The Bunce School, near Allenspark, Colorado near the Continental Divide in Boulder County, Colorado, is a historic one-room schoolhouse built in 1888. It was listed on the National Register of Historic Places in 1986.

It is a 25 by 17 feet (7.6 m × 5.2 m) log building built upon stone piers. It was built by V.H. Rowley and J.H. Bunce.

When listed, it was one of only two surviving log rural schoolhouses in Boulder County. In 2013, it was asserted to be the only surviving log schoolhouse in the county.

A second contributing building on the property is an outhouse.

It is located off Colorado State Highway 7 about 3.8 miles (6.1 km) south of Allenspark.

== See also ==
- National Register of Historic Places listings in Boulder County, Colorado
