= Robinson House (Louisville, Colorado) =

- U.S. National Register of Historic Places
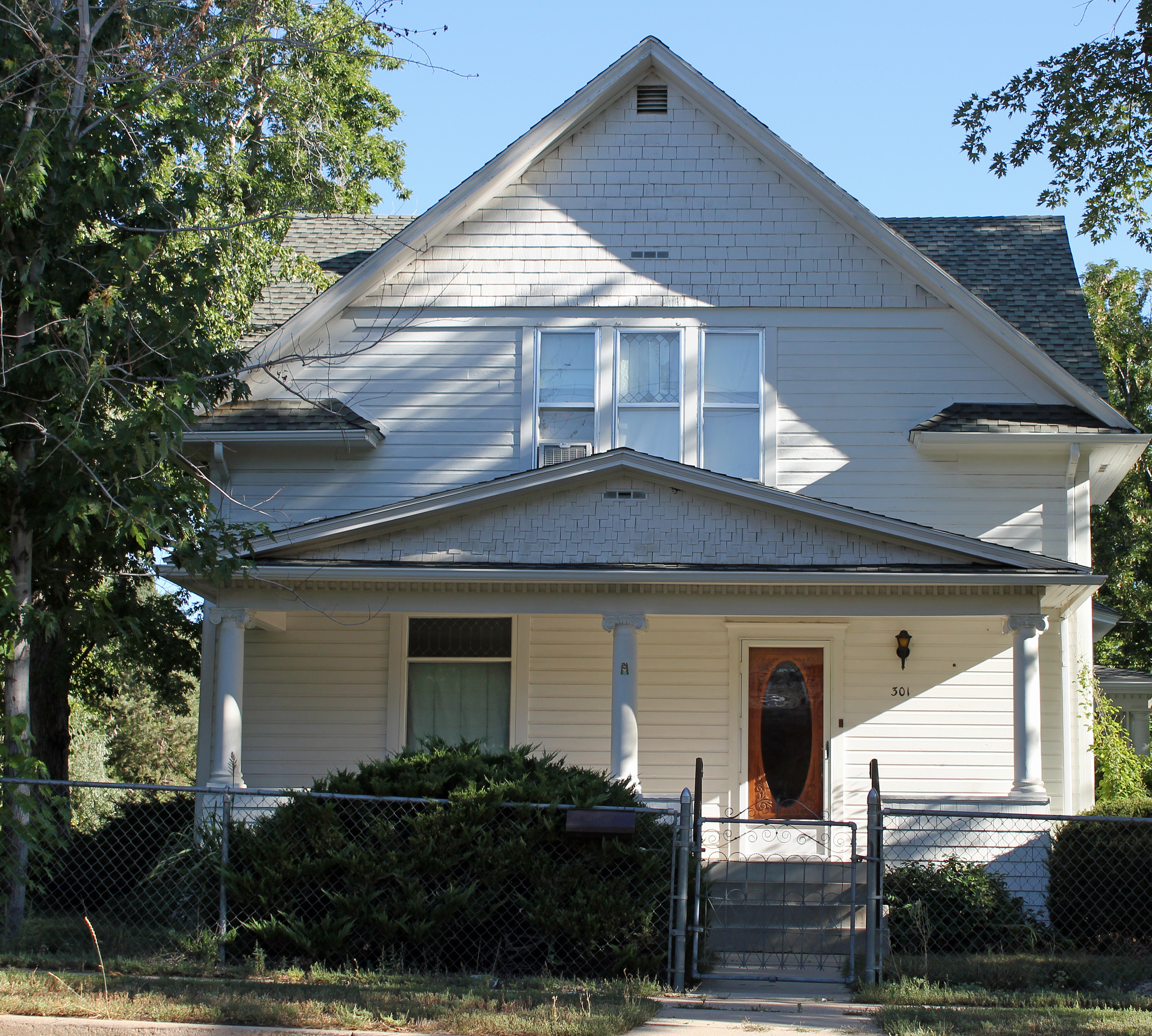

- Location within Colorado
- Location: 301 Spruce St., Louisville, Colorado
- Coordinates: 39.97798°N 105.13893°W
- Area: 0.3 acres (0.12 ha)
- Built: 1904
- Architectural style: Vernacular wood frame with elements of Colonial Revival style
- MPS: Louisville MRA
- NRHP reference No.: 86000228
- Added to NRHP: February 14, 1986

The Robinson House in Louisville, Colorado, at 301 Spruce, also known as the Cedarberg House, was built in 1904. It was listed on the National Register of Historic Places in 1986.

It is a vernacular wood frame two-and-a-half-story house with a Colonial Revival style porch extending across its front. The house was deemed significant as "one of the best and most elaborate examples of vernacular wood frame architecture in Louisville. In a community consisting primarily of one to one and one-half story modest frame houses, the Robinson House remains as one of Louisville's largest historic residences. The interior is one of the most elaborate and most intact, adding to its architectural significance."

It was listed as part of a 1985 multiple property study focusing on historic buildings of Louisville. The study identified this house and seven others as reflective of "Louisville's evolution and development during the heyday of coal mining which brought the town into existence."

== See also ==
- National Register of Historic Places listings in Boulder County, Colorado
