= Ward School (Ward, Colorado) =

- U.S. National Register of Historic Places
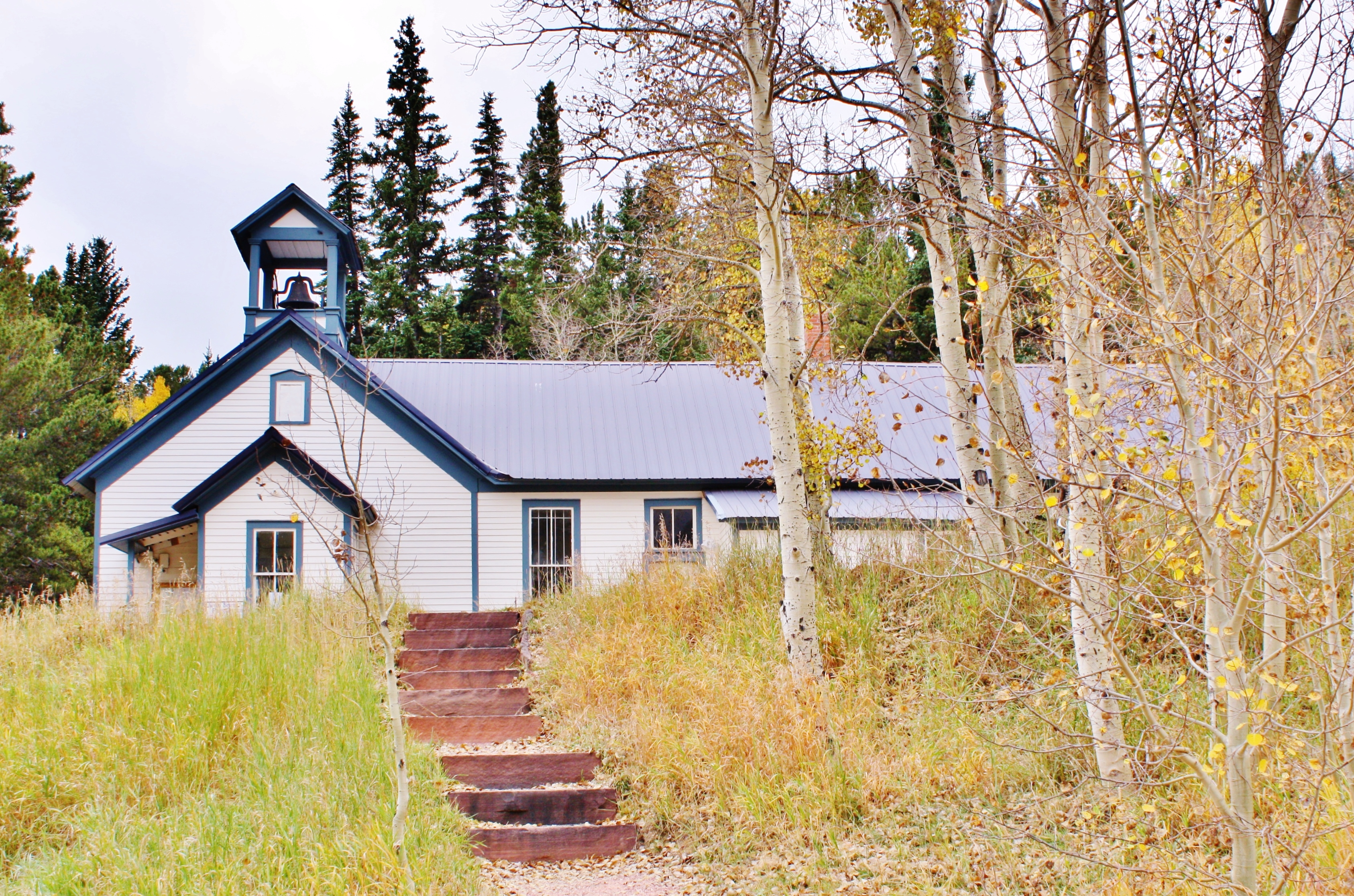
- School in 2014

- Location within Colorado
- Location: 66 Columbia St., Ward, Colorado
- Coordinates: 40.07171°N 105.50832°W
- Area: less than one acre
- Built: 1898
- MPS: Rural School Buildings in Colorado MPS, Metal Mining and Tourist Era Resources of Boulder County
- NRHP reference No.: 89000980
- Added to NRHP: August 3, 1989

The Ward School, at 66 Columbia St. in Ward, Colorado, is a historic school building later used as the town hall, public library, and post office of Ward Township, and also has been known as Ward Townhall and Post Office. It was built in 1898 and was listed on the National Register of Historic Places as "Ward School" in 1989.

It had "one of the most unusual civic uses" of schools in Colorado", having been draped with wet blankets and serving as a fire break line protecting houses above it during Ward's fire of 1900 which consumed the lower part of the town.

The first school in Ward was built in 1863.

This school is a "substantial" one-story building, and was one of the larger schoolhouses in western Boulder County in its era.

It was built after mining had declined, in the same year as the arrival of the railroad in Ward. "The Ward School has been an important symbol of the community throughout its history. Its original construction was an expression of hope for the prosperity of the community in the coming years of the 20th century and it represented the aspirations that the residents had for Ward's future."

It is one of Ward's oldest buildings, having survived the fire in 1900 which destroyed 53 buildings in Ward and otherwise having outlived the other survivors.

It was listed on the National Register as a resource identified in a study, the "Metal Mining and Tourist Era Resources of Boulder County MPS".

It was deemed consistent with the standards set up by that study for what it termed "Vernacular Community Institutional Buildings":

The design, materials and workmanship of the Ward School are typical of the distinguishing features of the Vernacular Community Institutional Building property types that were constructed in Boulder County's metal mining communities during the late 1800s. Its intact appearance and setting make it an excellent example of this historic building tradition of Colorado. The Ward School is one of the property types that meets the registration requirements of the Metal Mining and Tourist Era Resources of Boulder County Multiple Property nomination.

It was also named as consistent with the standards for historic listing set by the study "Rural School Buildings in Colorado MPS", but had already been listed.

The Ward School meets criteria A and C for its historic and architectural significance. Its historic importance is derived from school's function as an institution in the town of Ward, the center of one of the most productive mining districts in Boulder County. Architecturally, the building is important as a Vernacular Community Institutional Building, a property type that was typical of Boulder County metal mining communities of the late 19th and early 20th centuries.

The Ward post office, then 148 years old (though having moved buildings) was proposed to be closed in 2011.

It is one of 53 schoolhouses identified and photographed by History Colorado as historic rural schools around Colorado worthy of preservation.

== See also ==
- National Register of Historic Places listings in Boulder County, Colorado
