= Thunder Lake Trail-Bluebird Lake Trail =

- U.S. National Register of Historic Places
- Colorado State Register of Historic Properties
- Nearest city: Allens Park, Colorado
- Area: 24.6 acres (10.0 ha)
- Built: 1926
- Built by: Civilian Conservation Corps
- Architect: National Park Service
- Architectural style: Late 19th and Early 20th Century American Movements, Rustic
- MPS: Rocky Mountain National Park MPS
- NRHP reference No.: 07001472
- CSRHP No.: 5BL.10293
- Added to NRHP: January 29, 2008

The Thunder Lake Trail-Bluebird Lake Trail near Allens Park, Colorado was built in 1926. It was designed by National Park Service architects and was built by the Civilian Conservation Corps. It includes Late 19th and Early 20th Century American Movements, Rustic, and other architecture. The trail subsumes or is associated with Ouzel Lake Trail, the Arbuckle Lake(s) Trail, the Wild Basin Trail, and the North St. Vrain Creek Trail.

It was listed on the National Register of Historic Places in 2008. The listing included 24.6 acres (10.0 ha) with one contributing structure.

== See also ==
- Thunder Lake Patrol Cabin, also NRHP-listed
- Architects of the National Park Service
