= Rhoades House =

- U.S. National Register of Historic Places
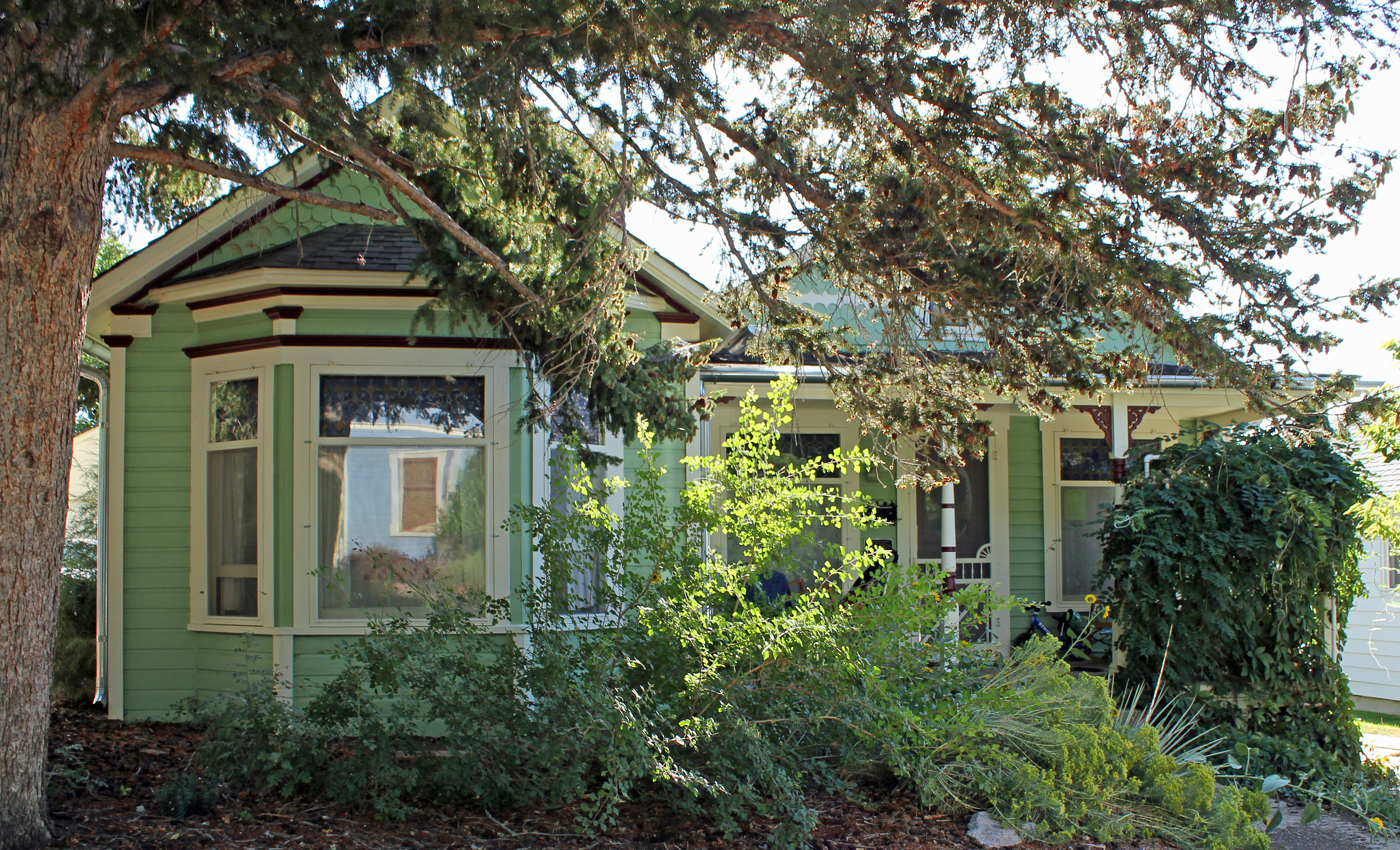
- House in 2011

- Location within Colorado
- Location: 1024 Grant Ave., Louisville, Colorado
- Coordinates: 39.98026°N 105.13546°W
- Area: 0.3 acres (0.12 ha)
- Built: 1906
- Architectural style: Vernacular Queen Anne
- MPS: Louisville MRA
- NRHP reference No.: 86000226
- Added to NRHP: February 14, 1986

The Rhoades House, at 1024 Grant Ave. (Note: History Colorado states the house is at 1024 Grant St.; Google maps shows it at 1024 Grant Ave.) in Louisville, Colorado in Boulder County, Colorado, was built in 1906. It was listed on the National Register of Historic Places in 1986.

It was originally owned by George W. Rhoades. In 1985 it was deemed "one of the best intact examples of Queen Anne Vernacular architecture in Louisville, and well illustrates the modest housing erected by coal miners in the community in the early 20th century." At the time of listing both its interior and exterior were "virtually intact".

It may in fact be a Sears catalog house.

The property also included a contributing structure: a historic frame shed, and a non-contributing garage.
