= Ginacci House =

Historic house in Colorado, United States

- U.S. National Register of Historic Places
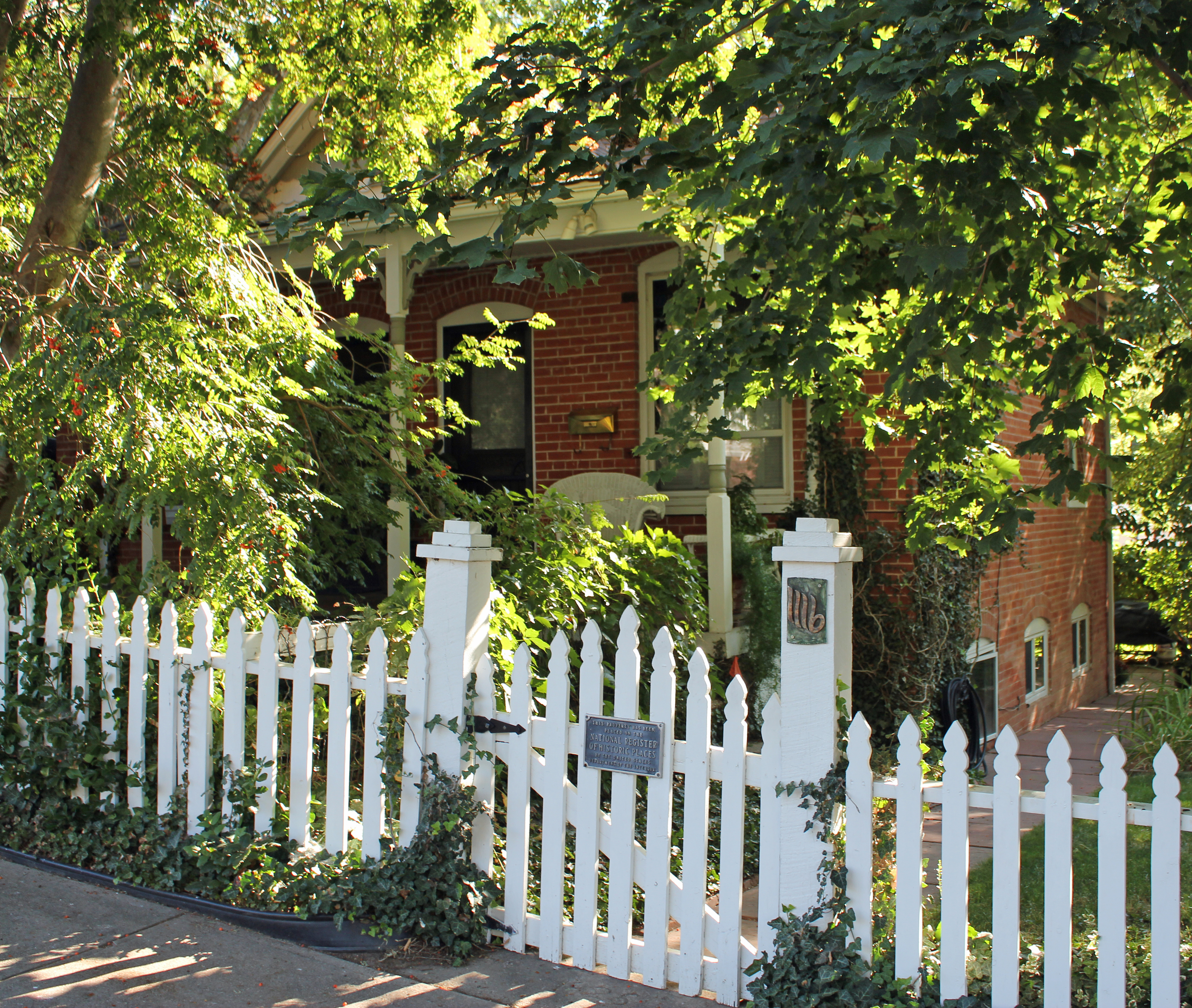

- Location within Colorado
- Location: 1116 LaFarge St., Louisville, Colorado
- Coordinates: 39°58′52″N 105°07′57″W
- Area: 0.3 acres (0.12 ha)
- Built: c.1908
- MPS: Louisville MRA
- NRHP reference No.: 86000213
- Added to NRHP: February 14, 1986

The Ginacci House, at 1116 LaFarge St. in Louisville, Colorado, was built around 1908. It was listed on the National Register of Historic Places in 1986. It is a one-story masonry house with a hipped roof, having two arched doors and two arched windows on its front facade. Gingerbread trim decorates a front porch and a gable in the center of the roof.

Among homes built for coal miners in Louisville, the house is unusual for its red brick construction and for association with Italian heritage. A 1926 extension housed a spaghetti-making machine.

It has also been known as the Leary House.
