= Wild Basin House =

Historic house in Colorado, United States

- U.S. National Register of Historic Places
- Colorado State Register of Historic Properties
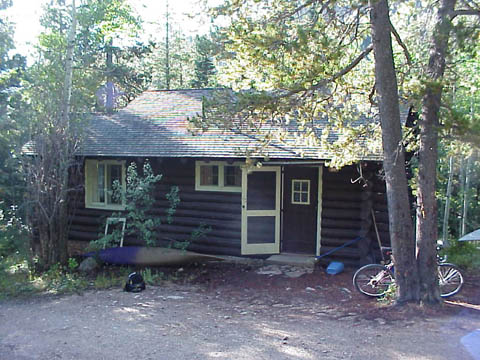

- Location within Colorado Location within the United States
- Nearest city: Estes Park, Colorado
- Coordinates: 40°12′29″N 105°33′56″W
- Area: less than one acre
- Built: 1931
- Architect: National Park Service Branch of Plans and Design
- Architectural style: NPS Rustic Architecture
- MPS: Rocky Mountain National Park MRA
- NRHP reference No.: 87001125
- CSRHP No.: 5BL.2390
- Added to NRHP: January 29, 1988

The Wild Basin House was built in the southeastern corner of Rocky Mountain National Park in Colorado, USA in 1931. The log residence was built to plans provided by the National Park Service Branch of Plans and Designs at a cost of $2500, in the National Park Service rustic style. The one-story house measures 23 feet (7.0 m) by 31 feet (9.4 m), resting on a fieldstone foundation, with a shallow-pitched wood shingle roof. The interior comprises three rooms.

The Wild Basin House was placed on the National Register of Historic Places on January 29, 1988. The Wild Basin Ranger Station, also listed on the NRHP, is nearby.

== See also ==
- National Register of Historic Places listings in Boulder County, Colorado
