= Valmont, Colorado =

Census-designated place in Boulder County, CO, USA

- Census-designated place
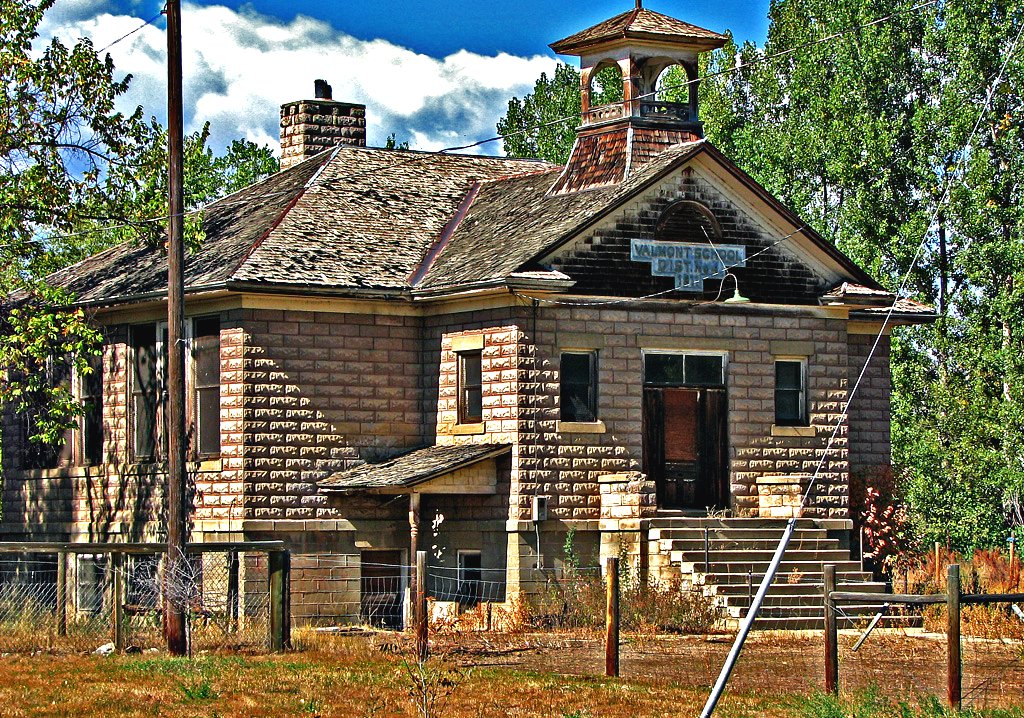
- Valmont School, built in 1911 (2010 photo)

- Location of the Valmont CDP in Boulder County, Colorado
- Coordinates: 40°02′03″N 105°12′23″W
- Country: United States
- State: Colorado
- County: Boulder County
- Platted: 1865

Government
  - Type: unincorporated community

Area
  - Total: 0.352 sq mi (0.912 km^{2})
  - Land: 0.269 sq mi (0.698 km^{2})
  - Water: 0.083 sq mi (0.214 km^{2})
- Elevation: 5,161 ft (1,573 m)

Population (2020)
  - Total: 64
  - Density: 240/sq mi (92/km^{2})
- Time zone: UTC-7 (MST)
  - Summer (DST): UTC-6 (MDT)
- ZIP Code: Boulder 80301
- Area codes: 303 & 720
- GNIS feature ID: 2583311

Valmont is an unincorporated community and a census-designated place (CDP) located in and governed by Boulder County, Colorado, United States. The CDP is a part of the Boulder, CO Metropolitan Statistical Area. The population of the Valmont CDP was 64 at the United States Census 2020. The land use consists of farming, low-density residential, some commercial, and a few school and church properties. The Boulder post office (Zip Code 80301) serves the area.

== History ==
Valmont was platted in 1865, and named for the valleys and peaks near the town site. A post office called Valmont was established in 1865, and remained in operation until 1901.

At 63rd St. and Andrus Rd. are the former Boulder County Poor Farm historic landmark and what is believed to be the former site of Fort Chambers, built in 1864 to shelter white settlers from potential native attacks. Some Company D soldiers who trained at Chambers were part of the infamous Nov. 1864 Sand Creek Massacre, as well as other atrocities. In 2018, the City of Boulder acquired the combined Poor Farm / Fort Chambers property. A 1950s marker commemorated Fort Chambers as being "used during the Indian uprising"; the controversial marker was removed in May 2023. The city has been working with the local tribes to develop the 113-acre site with the theme "Heal the Land; Heal the People".

The current two-room Valmont School on N. 61st Street, replaced the original 1869 building in 1911. The school closed in 1951, has been vacant since the 1980s and was purchased in 2021 by local business owners. With significant bell tower and roof damage and subsequent interior water damage, it remains one of the last few original Valmont structures. One notable feature is the use of ornamental concrete block architecture. Local preservationists hope the damaged building can be restored but it is a costly project and requires approval for some types of work, as well as craftsmen versed in the period techniques. In early 2024, the school was added to the Colorado Preservation group's list of Colorado’s Most Endangered Places.

The Valmont train depot is an abandoned station stop for the Union Pacific Railroad's Boulder Branch from Denver to Boulder, Colorado. It was originally built in 1890 to serve as a depot for the railroad's service on the Boulder Branch at milepost 24. Train numbers 515 and 516, the designated train numbers for the branch line, usually served this branch with the use of self-propelled railcars until the passenger service was discontinued in the 1960s.

For some years, the Boulder Valley Railway Historical Society had a low-key Valmont Railroad Museum, consisting of several historic locomotives and railcars, on leased unused rails by Valmont Rd. and Indian Rd. The operation was disbanded around 2015.

== Geography ==
Valmont is located in southeastern Boulder County, east of the city of Boulder, between Boulder Creek to the north and 200-foot-tall (60 m) Valmont Butte to the south. Valmont Road runs through the center of the community.

The Valmont CDP has an area of 225 acres (0.912 km^{2}), including 53 acres (0.214 km^{2}) of water.

== Demographics ==
The United States Census Bureau initially defined the Valmont CDP for the United States Census 2010.

Valmont CDP, Colorado
Year	Pop.	±%
2010	59	—
2020	64	+8.5%
Source: United States Census Bureau

== See also ==
- Boulder, CO Metropolitan Statistical Area
