= North St. Vrain Creek Bridge =

- U.S. National Register of Historic Places
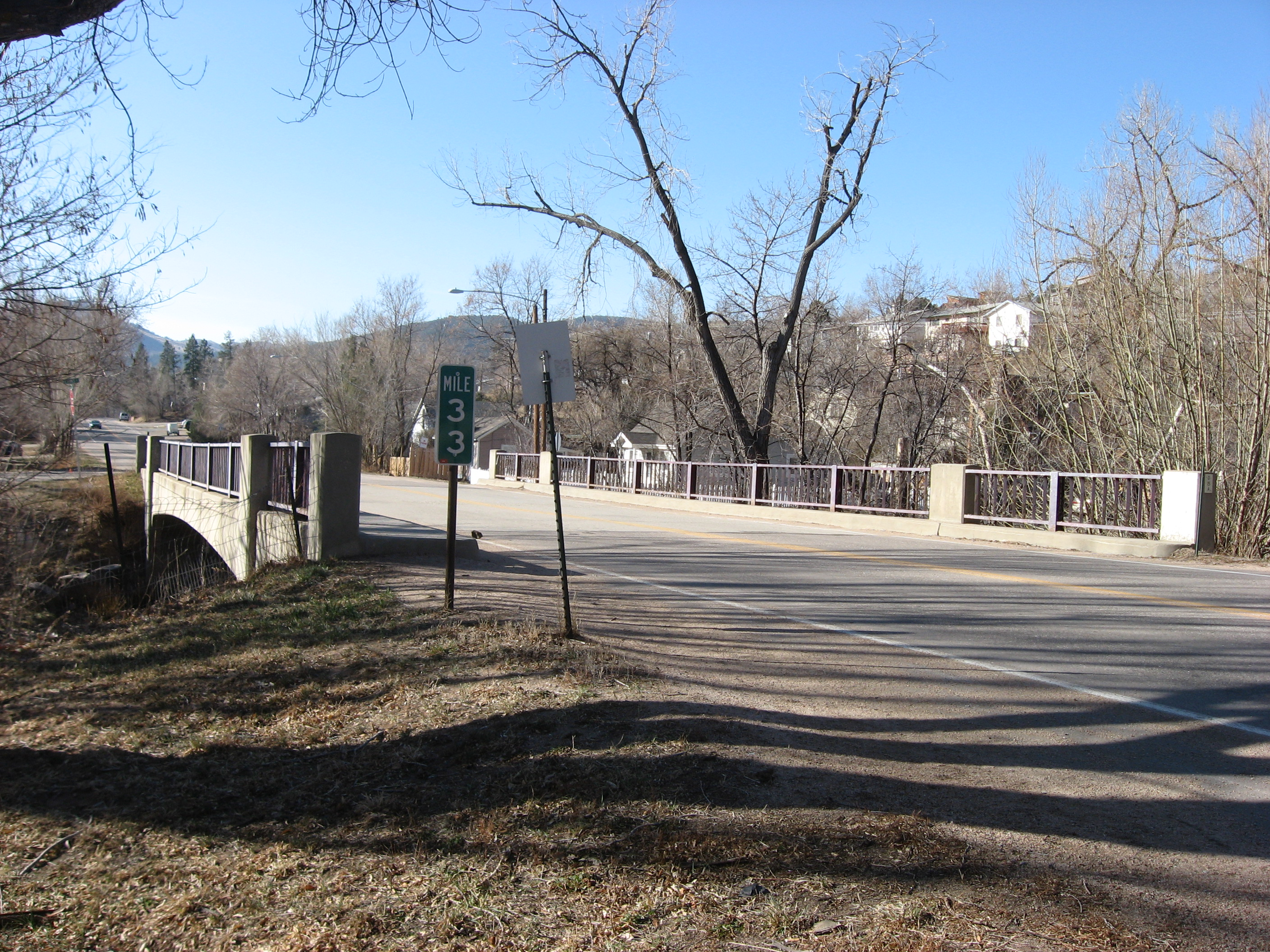

- Location within Colorado
- Location: CO 7 at milepost 32.98, Lyons, Colorado State Highway 7 at milepost 32.98, over the North St. Vrain Creek
- Coordinates: 40.22273°N 105.27167°W
- Area: less than one acre
- Built: 1955
- Built by: Lowdermilk Brothers
- Architect: US Bureau of Public Roads
- Architectural style: Concrete rigid frame
- MPS: Highway Bridges in Colorado MPS
- NRHP reference No.: 02001159
- Added to NRHP: October 15, 2002

The North St. Vrain Creek Bridge, in Lyons, Colorado, was built in 1955. It was listed on the National Register of Historic Places in 2002.

It brings State Highway 7, at its milepost 32.98, over the North St. Vrain Creek. It is a single-span road bridge designed by the U.S. Bureau of Public Roads and built in 1955 by Lowdermilk Brothers contractors. It is a concrete rigid frame bridge. The span is 60 feet (18 m) long; the roadway 30 feet (9.1 m) wide in a structure that is 66 by 37.30 feet (20.12 m × 11.37 m) overall.

It is located on the southern side of Lyons.

== See also ==
- National Register of Historic Places listings in Boulder County, Colorado
