= Ward Congregational Church =

Historic church in Colorado, United States

- U.S. National Register of Historic Places
- Colorado State Register of Historic Properties
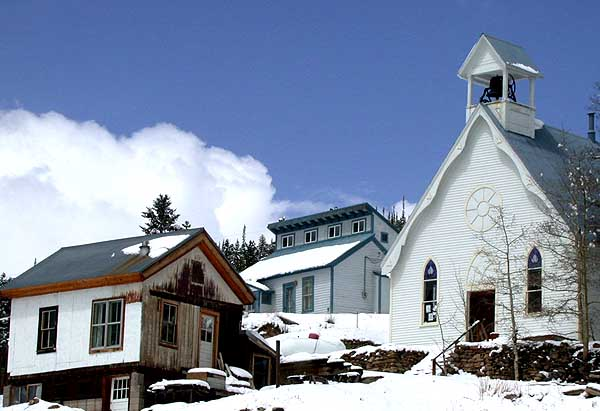
- Church in 2005

- Location within Colorado Location within the United States
- Location: 41 Modoc, Ward, Colorado
- Coordinates: 40°4′22″N 105°30′29″W
- Area: less than one acre
- Built: 1894
- MPS: Metal Mining and Tourist Era Resources of Boulder County MPS
- NRHP reference No.: 89000981
- CSRHP No.: 5BL.2672
- Added to NRHP: August 3, 1989

Ward Congregational Church, at 41 Modoc in Ward, Colorado, was built in 1894-95 and is listed on the National Register of Historic Places.

Also known as Ward Community Church, it was listed in 1989 as part of the "Metal Mining and Tourist Era Resources of Boulder County" multiple property submission. In its nomination it was asserted to be architecturally significant "because of its intact design, materials and workmanship which are typical of the building traditions of the period and make it an excellent example of the style of construction used for community buildings during this time in Boulder County."
