= Wild Basin Ranger Station =

- Wild Basin Ranger Station and House
- U.S. National Register of Historic Places
- Colorado State Register of Historic Properties
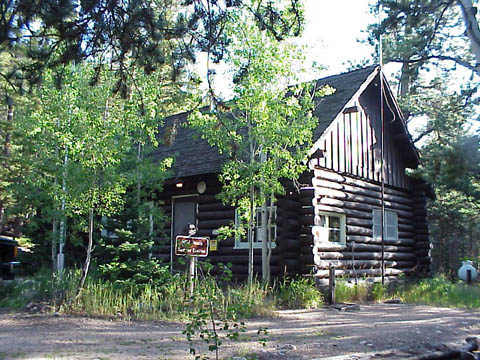

- Location within Colorado Location within the United States
- Nearest city: Estes Park, Colorado
- Coordinates: 40°12′32″N 105°33′55″W
- Area: less than one acre
- Built: 1932
- Architect: National Park Service Branch of Plans and Design
- Architectural style: NPS Rustic Architecture
- MPS: Rocky Mountain National Park MRA
- NRHP reference No.: 87001126
- CSRHP No.: 5BL.2391
- Added to NRHP: January 29, 1988

The Wild Basin Ranger Station is located in the southeastern portion of Rocky Mountain National Park, Colorado. Built in 1932, the ranger station is an example of National Park Service rustic architecture, built to plans by the National Park Service Branch of Plans and Design. The log structure is roofed with wood shingles and rests on a concrete foundation. The interior consists of three rooms, used for administrative and residential purposes.

The station features a steeply pitched gable roof, overhanging to form a porch at the front. The porch section of the roof is supported by corbeled logs at each end. The ranger station was placed on the National Register of Historic Places on January 29, 1988. The Wild Basin House, also listed on the NRHP, is located nearby.

== See also ==
- National Register of Historic Places listings in Boulder County, Colorado
