= Empson Cannery =

Cannery in Longmont, Colorado

- U.S. National Register of Historic Places
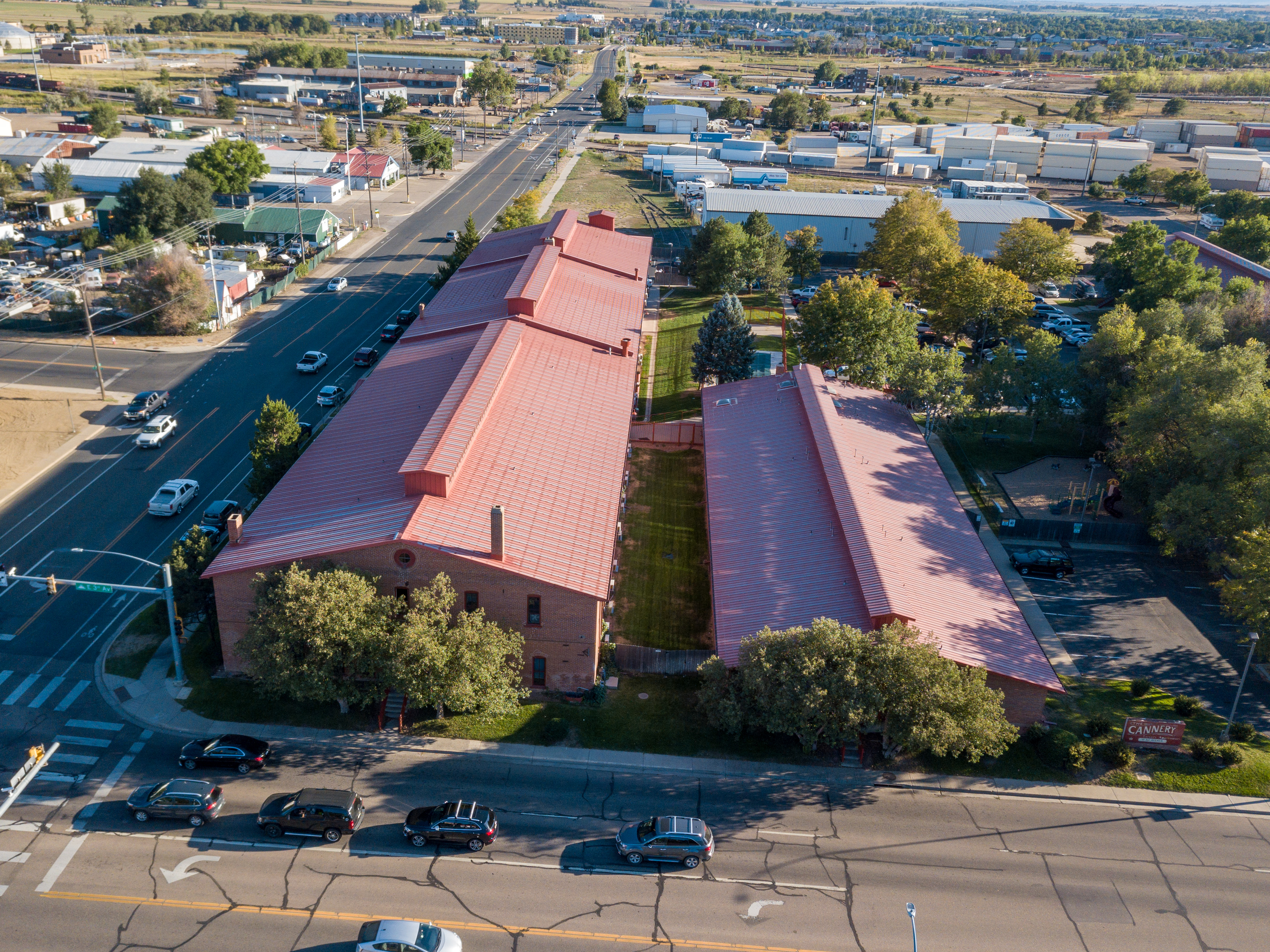

- Location within Colorado
- Location: 15 3rd Ave., Longmont, Colorado
- Coordinates: 40.163611°N 105.093611°W
- Area: 0.7 acres (0.28 ha)
- Built: 1901
- Built by: John Howard Empson
- NRHP reference No.: 84000796
- Added to NRHP: January 5, 1984

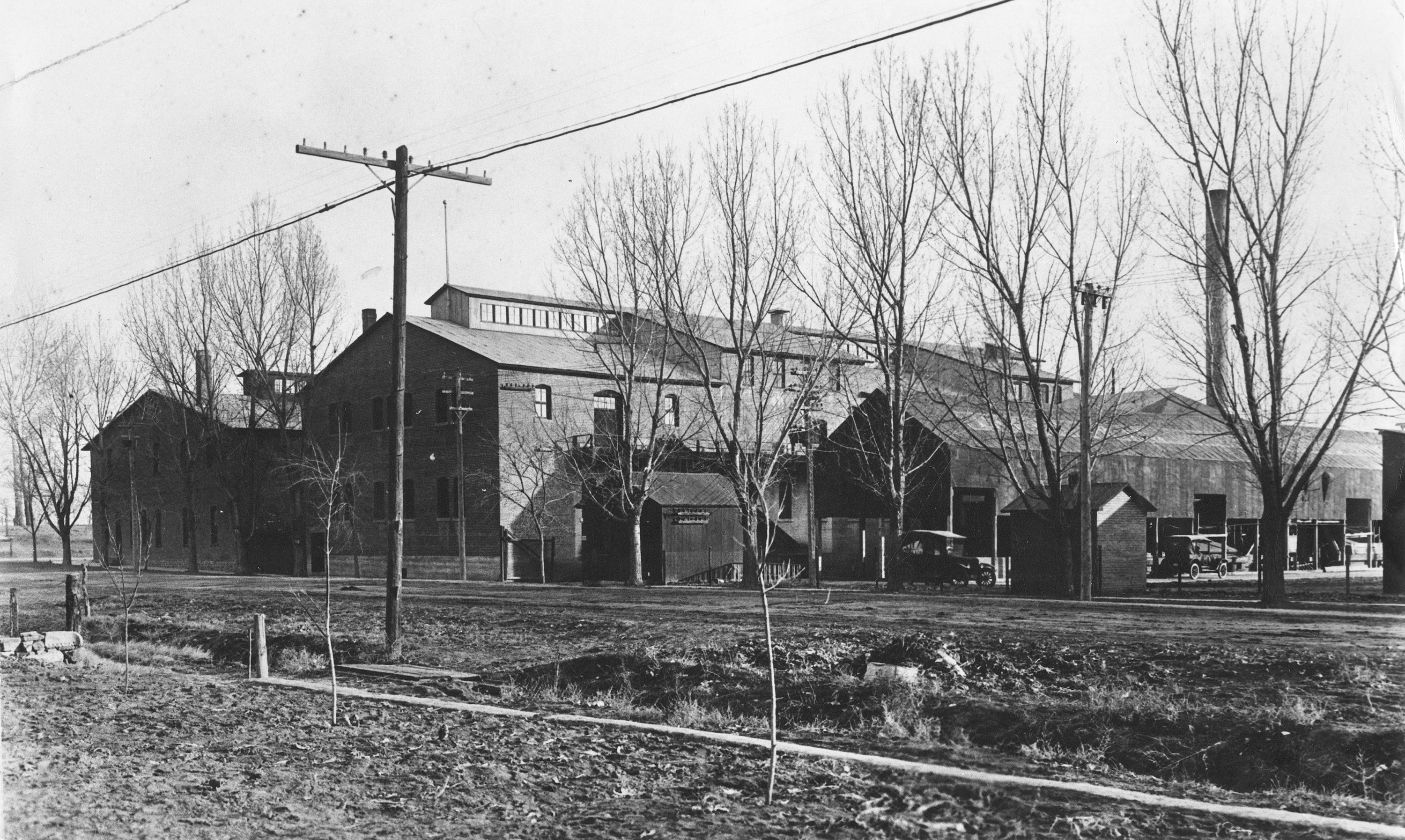
Empson Pea Cannery, c.1920

The Empson Cannery, also known as the Kuner-Empson Cannery, is a historic cannery and factory building located at 15 3rd Avenue in Longmont, Colorado. It was built in 1901. It was listed on the National Register of Historic Places in 1984.

== Description ==
Of several buildings on the site, the red brick warehouse building was nominated for National Register listing. This is a 72 by 327 feet (22 m × 100 m) building, actually including three separate structures:

- The northernmost section (c. 1901), about 72 by 150 feet (22 m × 46 m) in plan, two stories, with 12 inches (0.30 m) thick solid brick walls; the bearing walls stand about 28 feet (8.5 m) tall. It is a two-story structure with a 7-foot-high (2.1 m) crawl space below. There are three weight bearing walls that are 28 feet (8.5 m) high. The wood-decked, metal-finished roof is 107 feet (33 m) long, with two brick chimneys.
- The middle section (c. 1907) is attached to the northern portion of the first and second floors. It is 100 feet (30 m) in length and approximately 72 feet (22 m) wide. There is an 8-foot-high (2.4 m) basement space and a loading dock on the east side.
- The southernmost section (c. 1912) has solid brick walls, 12 inches (0.30 m) thick. The structure is 76 feet (23 m) long by 72 feet (22 m) wide with a full basement. Two brick chimneys are located on the east side.

== History ==
John Howard Empson (1849–1926), a confectioner from Cincinnati, founded the cannery and built the building. He is considered a "pioneer in the canning industry". The main crop of the cannery was peas, and Empson received several patents for his pea-canning devices. He also developed an improved pea stock that was both sweeter and smaller. Max Kuner was a pioneer in the pickle industry.

At the turn of the 20th century, the cannery was the largest employer in Longmont, having a considerable economic effect on the region. In 1903, the cannery was producing 300 railroad carloads of canned produce annually, and employed 400 workers. It was used as the warehouse of the Empson Cannery (later the Kuner-Empson Cannery) until the end of 1970.

== Historical significance ==
The warehouse is historically significant as the building symbolizes the final step in locally produced food preserving and processing. It was the single largest building in the area, and it dominated the site on which it was constructed. "For over eighty years it has been symbolic of the cannery itself."

== See also ==
- National Register of Historic Places listings in Boulder County, Colorado
