= Hoverhome and Hover Farmstead =

- U.S. National Register of Historic Places
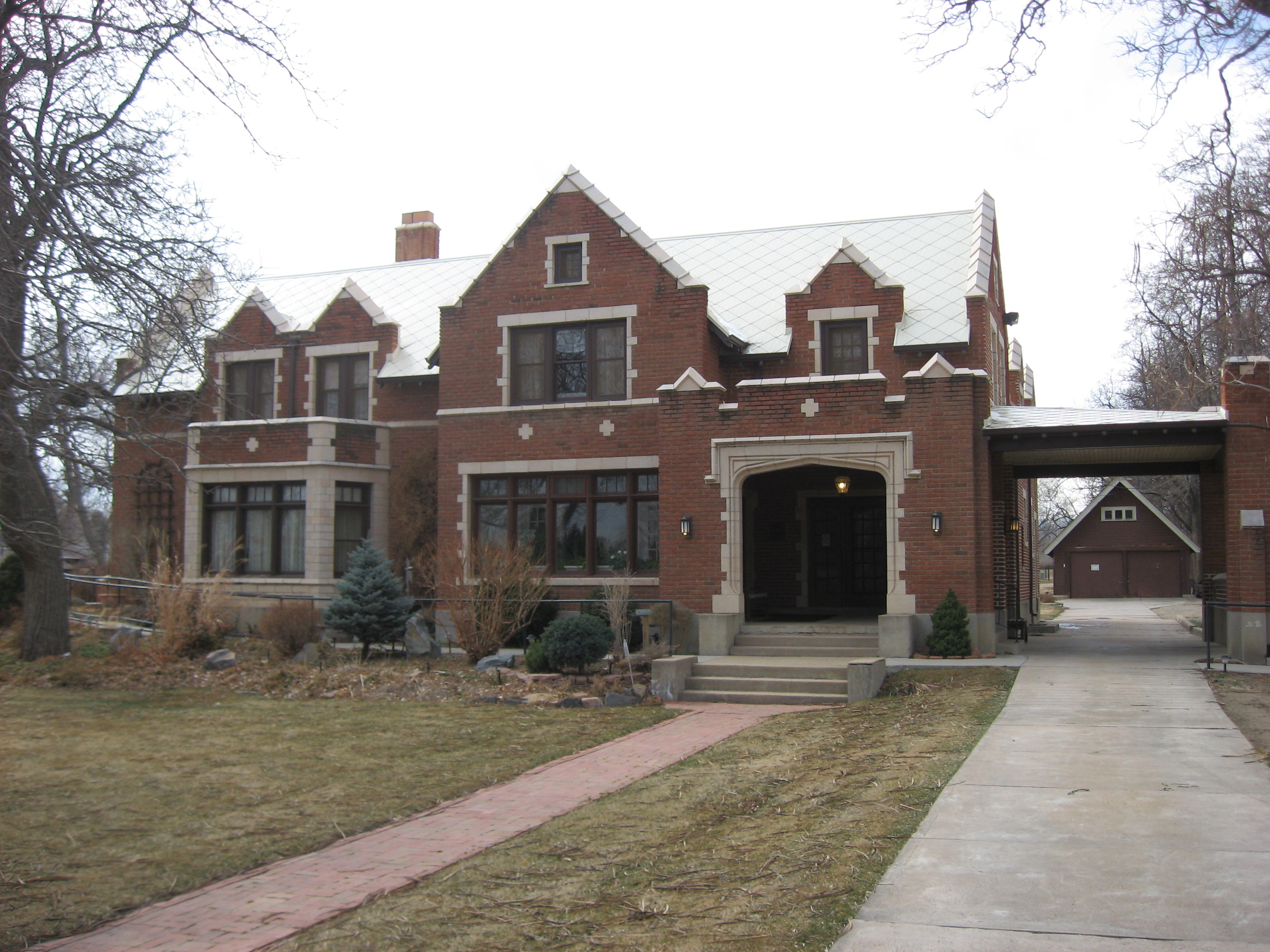

- Location within Colorado
- Location: 1303-1309 Hover Rd., Longmont, Colorado
- Coordinates: 40.18217°N 105.13151°W
- Area: 4.3 acres (1.7 ha)
- Built: 1902
- Architect: Robert S. and Frank S. Roeschlaub
- Architectural style: Tudor Revival
- NRHP reference No.: 98001555
- Added to NRHP: January 15, 1999

The Hoverhome and Hover Farmstead, at 1303-1309 Hover Rd. in Longmont, Colorado, are the remains of a historic farmstead. The current 4.3 acres (1.7 ha) site was listed on the National Register of Historic Places in 1999.

A farmstead house built in 1893 is included, and also a Tudor Revival house, the "Hoverhome" or Hover Mansion, which was built in 1913–14. The latter was designed by Denver architects Robert S. Roeschlaub and Frank S. Roeschlaub. The site also includes agricultural buildings dating from c.1902 to c.1910, developed after Charles Hover purchased the property in 1902. These are among five more contributing buildings, seven contributing structures, and two contributing sites covered in the listing.

Charles Lewis Hover had the Hoverhome built in 1913-1914 for himself, his wife Katherine, and their adopted daughter Beatrice; their family is the only family to have lived in the home. It is a 1.5-story, 6,000 square feet (560 m^{2}), brick, east-facing building. The mansion has an irregular plan about 65 by 30 feet (19.8 m × 9.1 m) in dimension, and includes a porte-cochere. The mansion is trimmed by terra cotta.

The property includes a formal garden site developed by Katherine Hover and Beatrice Hover. Along the northern boundary was an irrigation ditch along which numerous irises grew, since abandoned and filled in, but in 1999 there were plans to re-establish the historic iris border. The eastern boundary had a "flourishing hedge" of Rosa 'Harison's Yellow' roses, a variety which was spread along the Oregon Trail and in scattered western homesteads in the late 1800s. The yellow rose hedge was removed in the 1980s when Hover Road was widened, but in 1999 it was being re-established along a chain link fence line.

The Hoverhome portion also includes a garden house/tool shed building and a garage building, and a stone grill. The farmhouse portion also includes a barn, a farm garage, and a mill/grain elevator. The contributing structures of the farmstead are:

- a creamery, a 10 by 10 feet (3.0 m × 3.0 m) brick structure with a steep pyramidal roof,
- a wood and coal shed, a 10 by 14 feet (3.0 m × 4.3 m) wood-frame structure with board and batten siding,
- a chicken house with a cedar-shingled roof,
- two round metal grain silos, relocated in 1996 from just north of the listed area so that they would not be demolished,
- a stock watering trough, which is a concrete bowl in shape, relocated from west of the mill/elevator.

The mansion was designated a Longmont Designated Landmark in 1977 as "Hover Home".

When listed, the property was owned by the St. Vrain Historical Society, which had been aided by grants from Colorado's State Historical Fund, and it was operated as an events venue.

The property was deemed significant for its agricultural association, for its association with Charles Hover, and for the architecture of the Hoverhome and of the farmstead buildings.
