= Salina School =

- U.S. National Register of Historic Places
- Colorado State Register of Historic Properties
- Boulder County Historic Landmark
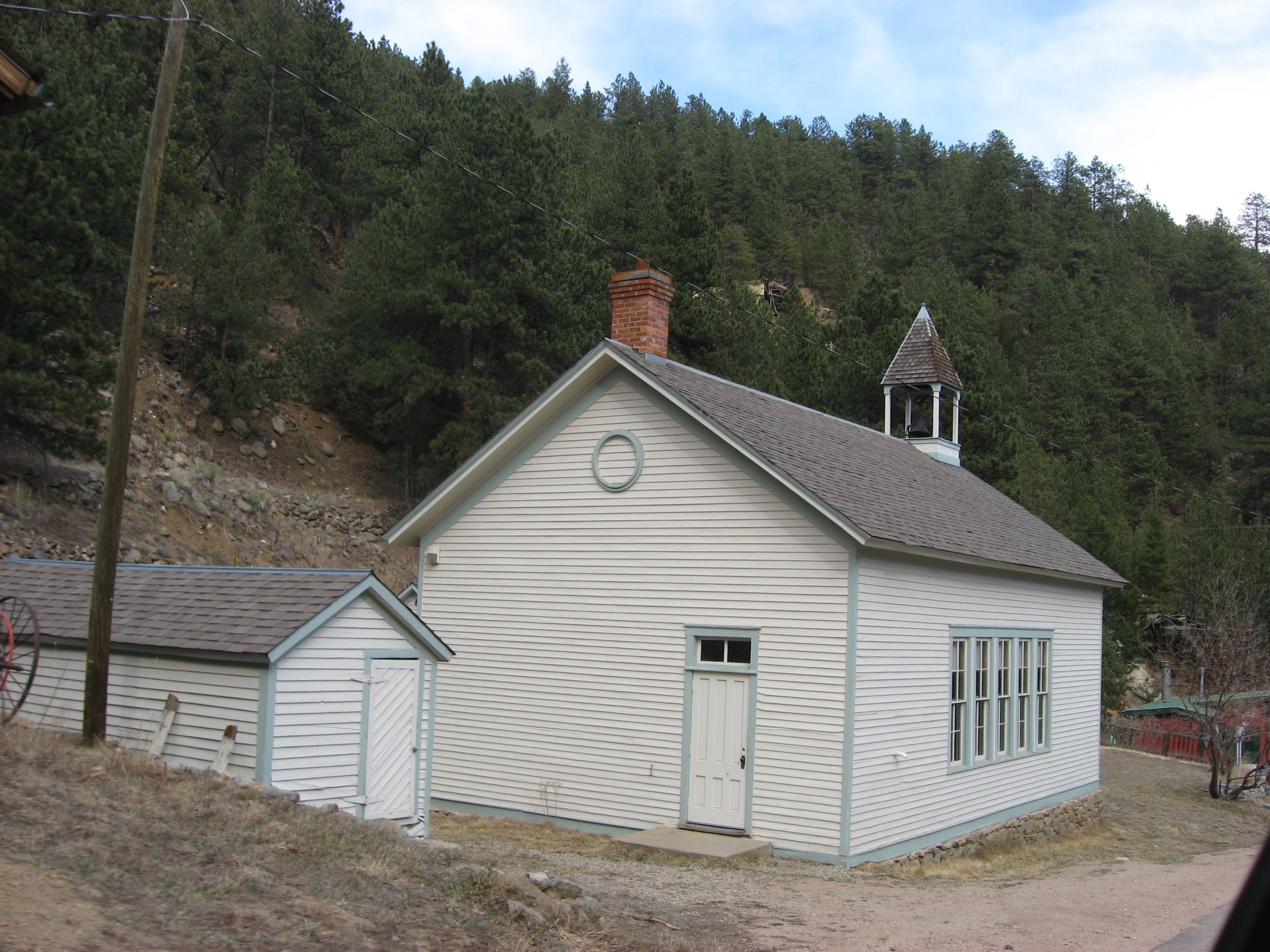

- Location within Colorado Location within the United States
- Location: 536 Gold Run Rd. Salina, Colorado, United States
- Coordinates: 40°03′15″N 105°22′37″W
- Built: ca. 1875-1876
- Architectural style: vernacular wood frame
- NRHP reference No.: 89000984
- CSRHP No.: 5BL.2676
- BCHL No.: HP-96-06

Significant dates
- Added to NRHP: August 3, 1989
- Designated CSRHP: August 3, 1989
- Designated BCHL: May 20, 1997

The Salina School, also known as the Salina Schoolhouse, is a one-room schoolbuilding in the former mining town of Salina in Boulder County, Colorado, built around 1875 or 1876. It was listed on the National Register of Historic Places in 1989.

Throughout the mining boom, the schoolhouse functioned as a hub of social activity in Salina, hosting dances, box socials, and other community activities. Today the building is owned by the Salina Community Association, a nonprofit group of local residents, and maintained as a space for classes, films, concerts, and other community events.
