= Thunder Lake Patrol Cabin =

- U.S. National Register of Historic Places
- Colorado State Register of Historic Properties
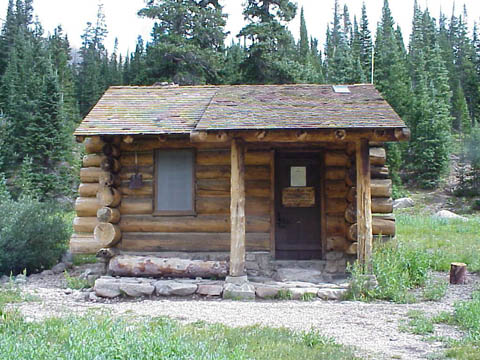

- Location within Colorado Location within the United States
- Nearest city: Estes Park, Colorado
- Coordinates: 40°13′20″N 105°38′39″W
- Area: less than one acre
- Built: 1930
- Architectural style: NPS Rustic, log cabin
- MPS: Rocky Mountain National Park MRA
- NRHP reference No.: 87001124
- CSRHP No.: 5BL.2392
- Added to NRHP: January 29, 1988

The Thunder Lake Patrol Cabin is a small structure in Rocky Mountain National Park, Colorado. Built in 1930, the 12-foot (3.7 m) by 16-foot (4.9 m) cabin may have been built as a simple shelter, but has more recently been used on an occasional basis as a backcountry patrol cabin in the Wild Basin area. The one story one-room log cabin is not used in the winter, but does have a stove with a stone fireplace. The main cabin is gable-roofed, with a small shed-roofed porch, and is a good example of the National Park Service rustic style. The logs are saddle-notched, projecting an increasing distance at their ends from top to bottom.

The Thunder Lake Cabin was placed on the National Register of Historic Places on January 29, 1988.

== See also ==
- National Register of Historic Places listings in Boulder County, Colorado
