= Norlin Quadrangle Historic District =

Historic district in Colorado, United States

Coordinates: 40.0087°N 105.2730°W

- U.S. National Register of Historic Places
- U.S. Historic district
- Colorado State Register of Historic Properties
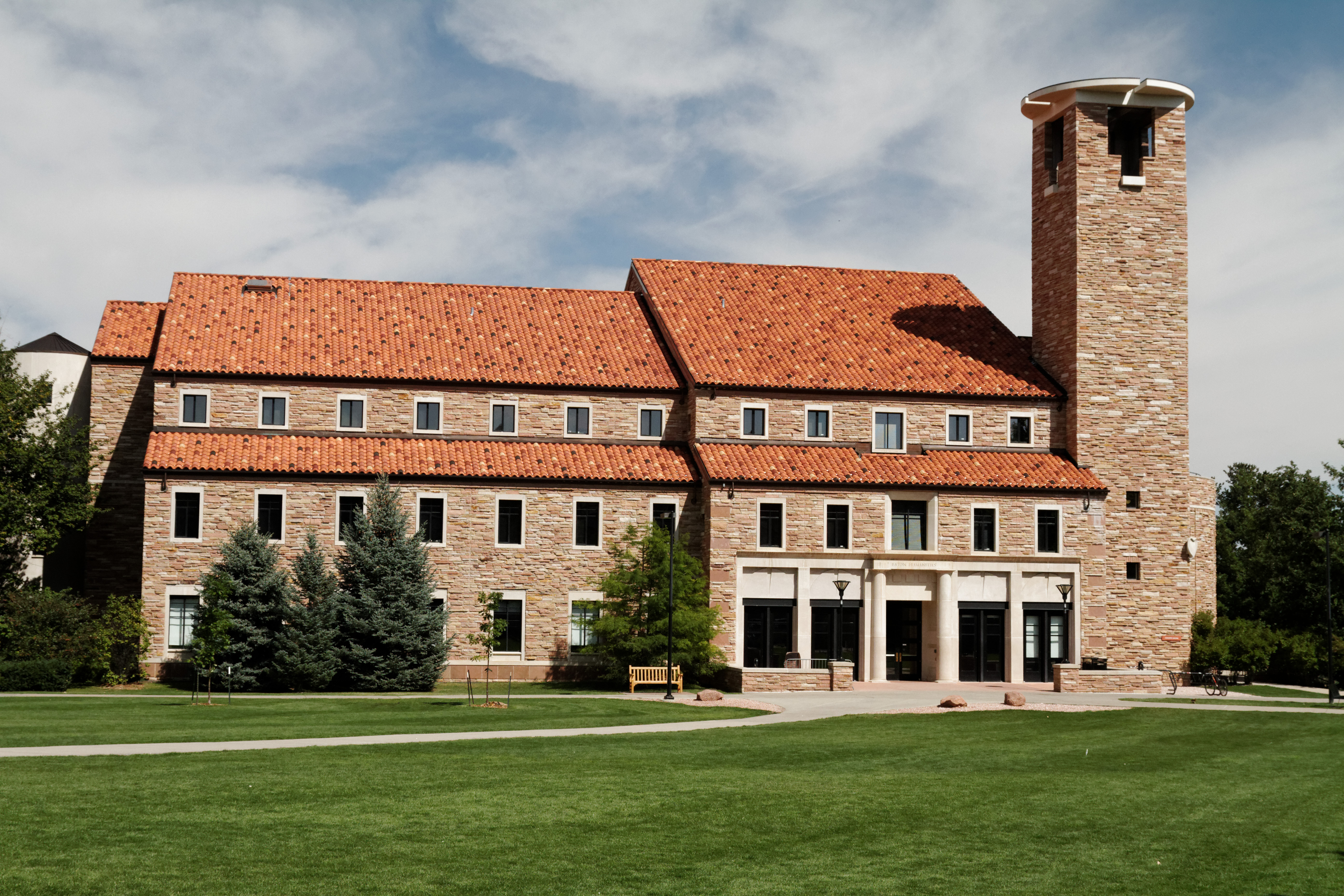
- Eaton Humanities Building

- Location within Colorado Location within the United States
- Location: University of Colorado campus, Boulder, Colorado
- Area: 33.5 acres (13.6 ha)
- Architect: Klauder, Charles, et al.
- Architectural style: Late 19th and 20th Century Revivals, Late Victorian
- NRHP reference No.: 80000879
- CSRHP No.: 5BL.360
- Added to NRHP: March 27, 1980

The Norlin Quadrangle Historic District comprises the core of the main campus of the University of Colorado campus in Boulder, Colorado. The twelve buildings were designed to reflect a variety of architectural styles. The quadrangle was named after University of Colorado president George Norlin. Buildings on the quadrangle include the Norlin Library, Woodbury Arts and Sciences Building, Old Main, the Hale Science Building, University Theater, Macky Concert Hall and the Women's Studies Cottage.

== Design ==
According to its 1979 NRHP nomination, there are four types of buildings in the district: pioneer Victorian brick buildings including the Old Main building; stone buildings with Gothic or Romanesque Revival stylings; two light brick European ones; and the "Rural Italian Renaissance buildings" designed by Charles Klauder. The quadrangle occupies much of the land that was donated by Boulder residents for the university in 1872.

Klauder's initial plans were developed in 1919, proposing the demolition of most of the older buildings in the area. The university's rapid growth discouraged the removal of buildings, and the quadrangle's design evolved to accommodate them. In addition to the landscape design and exterior architectural character of the district, the interiors of the component buildings show a notable attention to detail.

== Major components ==
The chief contributing buildings in the district are:

- Old Main (1876), E.H. Dimick, architect
- Macky Auditorium (1902-1922), Gove and Walsh, architects
- Woodbury Arts and Sciences Building (1890), F.A. Hale, architect
- Norlin Library (1939), Charles Z. Klauder, architect
- Ekeley Chemical Laboratories (1898, 1925, 1973), Ernest Varian original structure, Klauder 1925
- Hellems Arts and Sciences Building (1921), Klauder
- University Theater 1921, Klauder
- Guggenheim Geography Building (1902)
- Cottage Number 1 (1885)
- Hale Science Building (1892-1895)
- Koenig Alumni Center (1885), Varian
- McKenna Languages Building (1937), Klauder

Norlin Quadrangle was listed on the National Register of Historic Places on March 27, 1980.
