= Little Church in the Pines =

Historic church in Colorado, United States

- U.S. National Register of Historic Places
- Colorado State Register of Historic Properties
- Boulder County Historic Landmark
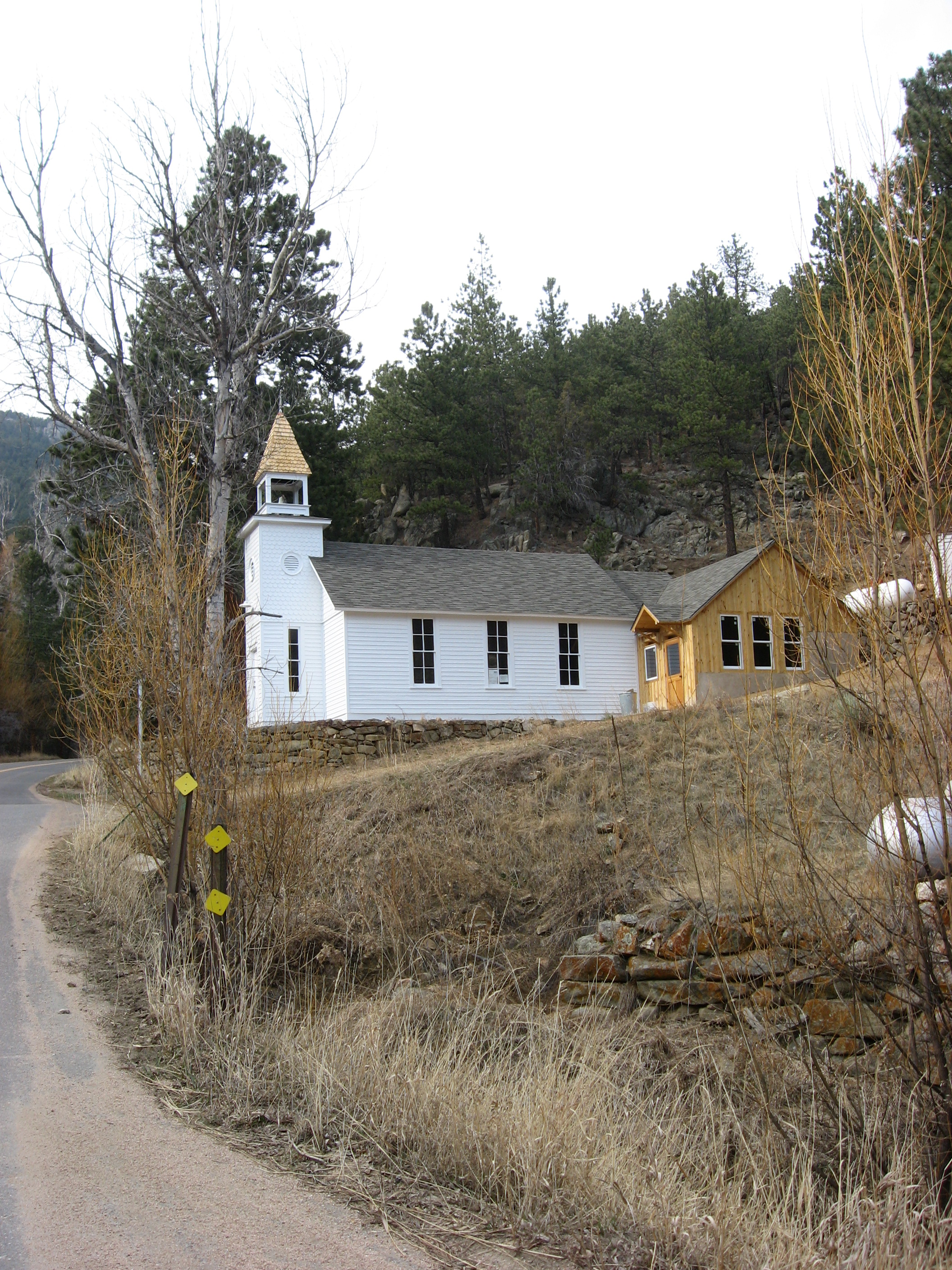

- Location within Colorado Location within the United States
- Location: 414 Gold Run Rd. Salina, Colorado, United States
- Coordinates: 40°03′12″N 105°22′33″W
- Built: c. 1902 - 1908
- Architectural style: vernacular wood frame
- NRHP reference No.: 89000983
- CSRHP No.: 5BL.255
- BCHL No.: HP-02-02

Significant dates
- Added to NRHP: August 3, 1989
- Designated CSRHP: August 3, 1989
- Designated BCHL: March 14, 2002

The Little Church in the Pines is a c. 1902-1908 building in the former mining town of Salina in Boulder County, Colorado. The church held regular Sunday School classes for children, and services whenever a traveling minister came to town. As the mining boom came to an end and the town's population shrunk, the building fell into disuse, and briefly served as a mine office before being abandoned. In 1948 it was purchased by a neighborhood group and has been used ever since for nondenominational worship and community events. The Little Church in the Pines was placed on the National Register of Historic Places in 1989.

During the 2013 Colorado floods, the ground washed out from underneath half of the building, including the bell tower, and emergency supports had to be installed to stabilize the structure until a new foundation could be built and the area refilled.
