= Boulder County Poor Farm =

- U.S. National Register of Historic Places
- Colorado State Register of Historic Properties
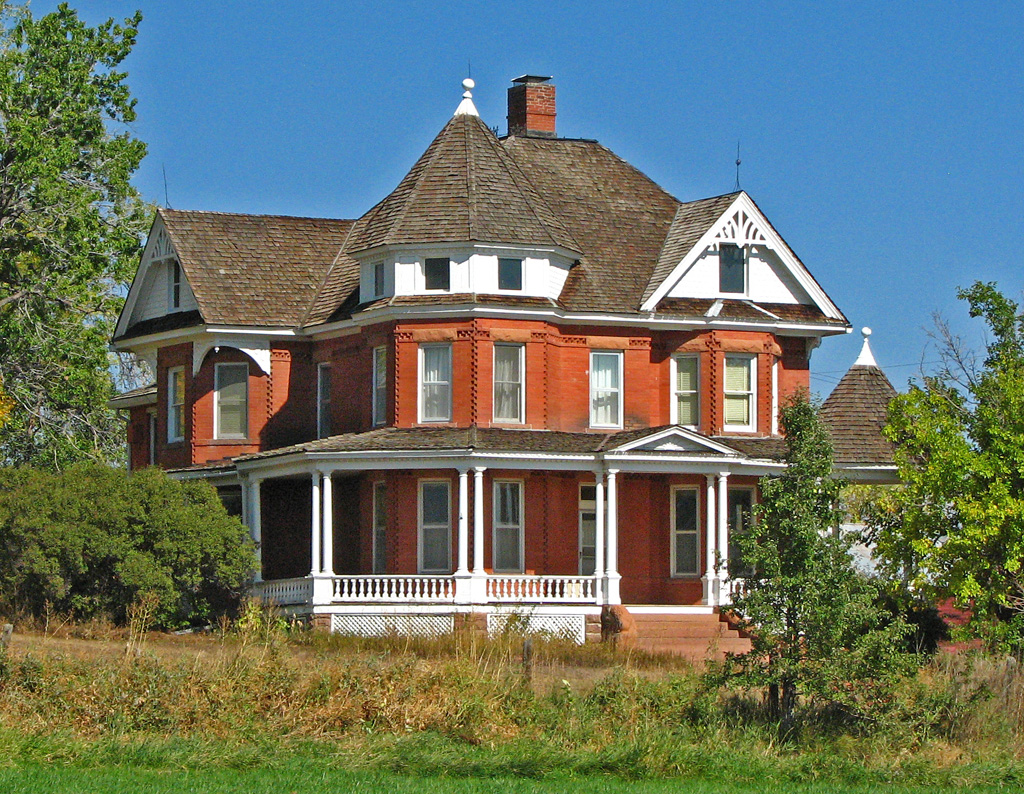

- Location within Colorado Location within the United States
- Location: 3902 63rd St. Boulder County, Colorado, United States
- Coordinates: 40°02′44″N 105°12′23″W
- Architectural style: Queen Anne
- NRHP reference No.: 01000969
- CSRHP No.: 5BL.378

Significant dates
- Added to NRHP: September 13, 2011
- Designated CSRHP: September 13, 2011

Boulder County Poor Farm is the site of a poor farm in the Valmont area of Boulder County, Colorado, where long-term care for the county's indigent was provided from 1902 to 1918. The site operated as a farm from 1897, and many of the original farm buildings are still present, including a main house built in Queen Anne style. It was listed on the National Register of Historic Places in 2011.

Starting in 1875, Boulder County leased a series of properties to serve as the county poorhouse. In 1902, the 120-acre (49 ha) farm on today's 63rd Street was purchased to house the Boulder County Poor Farm and Hospital; many modifications were made to the farm house, including the construction of a two-story dormitory annex. By 1918, a larger building was needed, and the institution was moved to another location. The farm was sold and returned to private operation. In 2018, a century after the county left the property, the city of Boulder purchased the combined Poor Farm / Fort Chambers (a/k/a Fort Valmont) property for Open Space Mountain Parks (OSMP) use.
