= Salina, Colorado =

Former mining town in Boulder County, CO, USA

Coordinates: 40°03′05″N 105°22′28″W

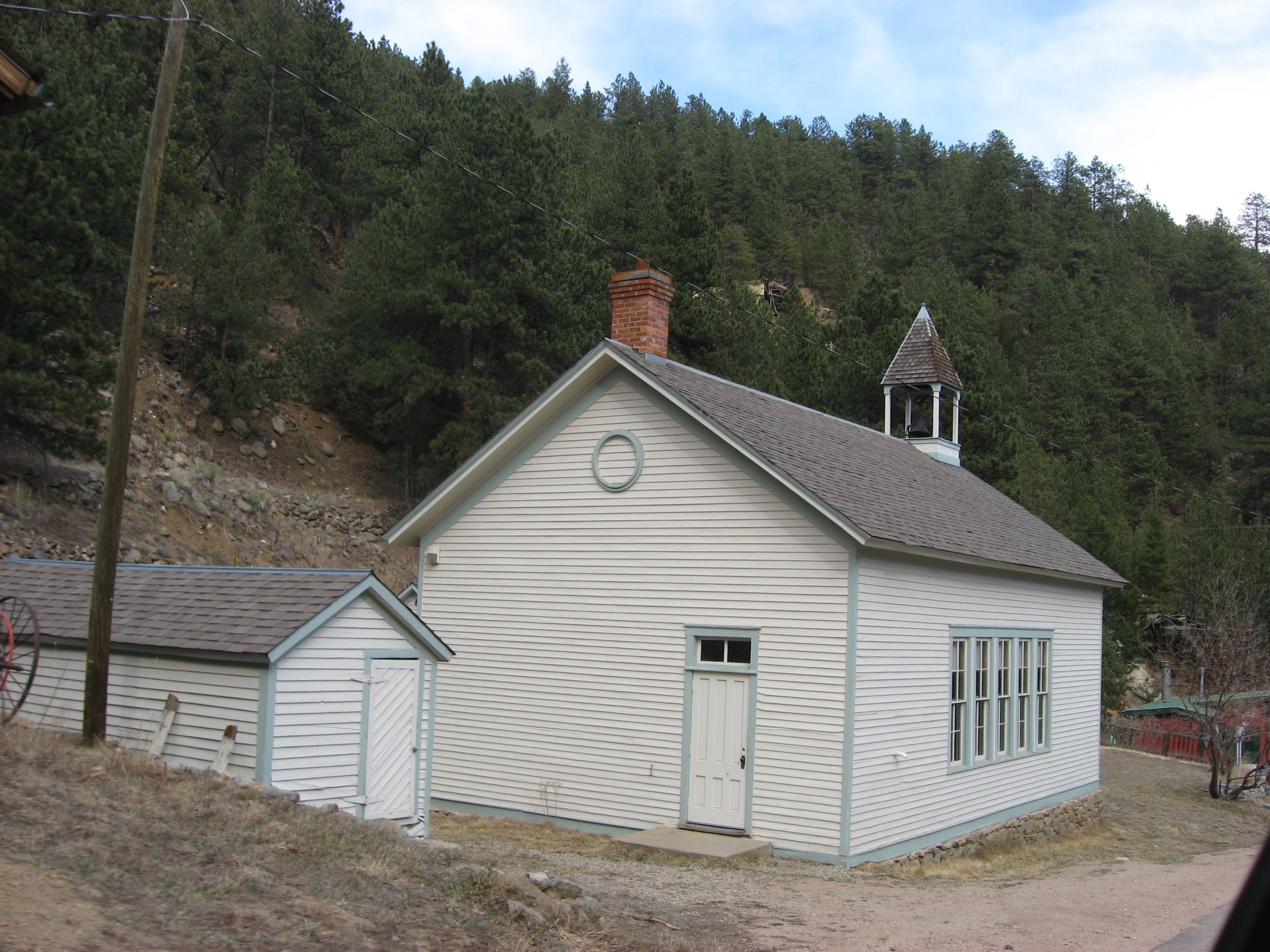
Rear (northern) view of the Salina School in the isolated community of Salina, Colorado, United States, located at 536 Gold Run Road. Built in 1875, the small school is listed on the National Register of Historic Places.

Salina is a former mining town in Boulder County, Colorado, United States, approximately 7 miles (11 km) west of Boulder. Established in 1874, after Colorado's first gold discovery in 1859, Salina was founded by miners who migrated to Boulder from Salina, Kansas. It is located at the junction of Four Mile Canyon and Gold Run roads. The mining camp was originally accessible only by horseback or wagons pulled by mules but later became part of Colorado's Switzerland Trail when the Greeley, Salt Lake, & Pacific narrow gauge railroad was built in the early 1880s. Today, most of Salina's original structures still stand, including the one-room schoolhouse, Salina School, and church, the Little Church in the Pines, despite some impact from the Fourmile Canyon wildfire in 2010 and historic flooding during the 2013 Colorado floods.
