= Boulder Creek Bridge (Boulder, Colorado) =

- U.S. National Register of Historic Places
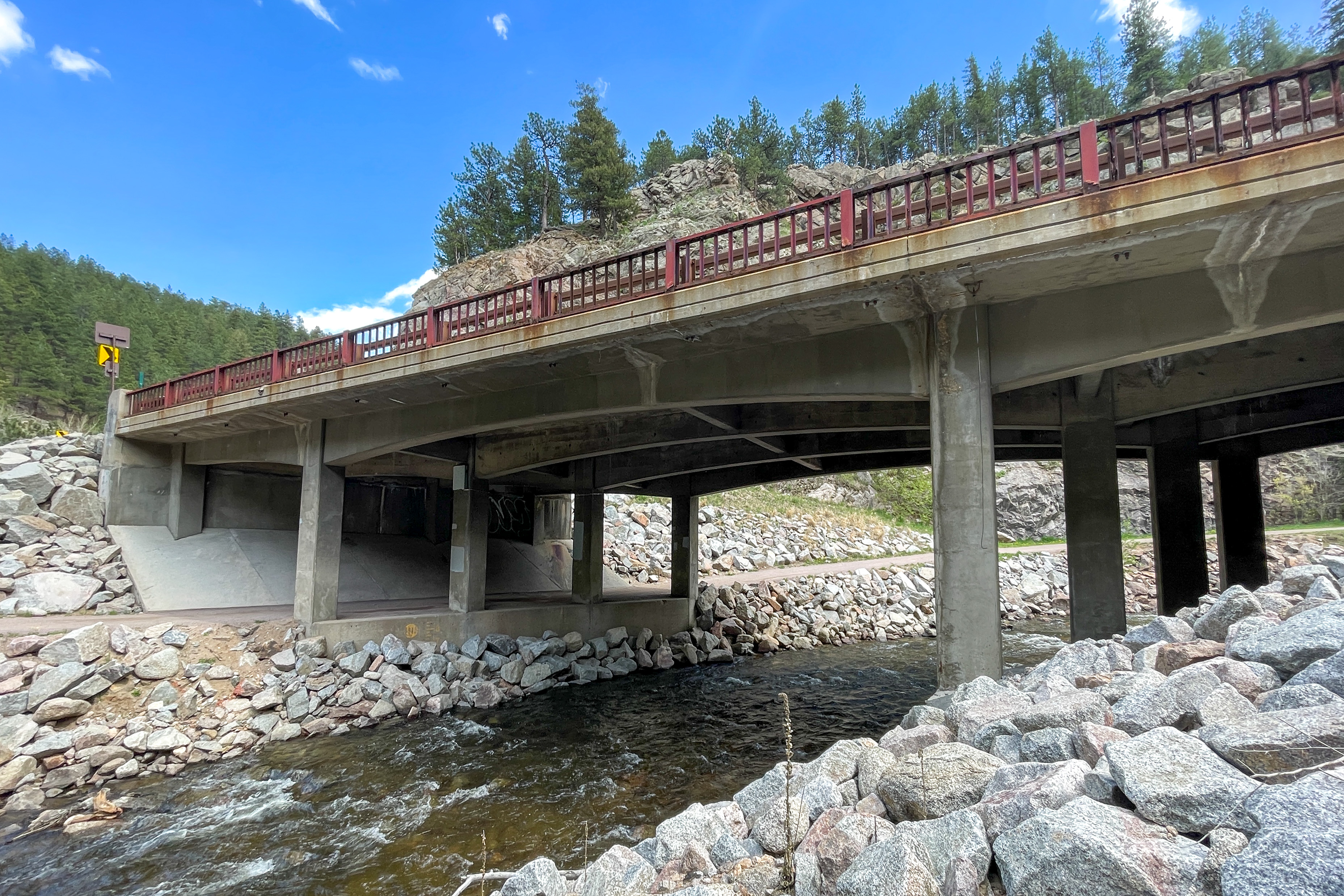
- Arched support beam is visible in shadow under bridge deck

- Location within Colorado
- Location: State Highway 119 at milepost 39.13
- Nearest city: Boulder, Colorado
- Coordinates: 40.01476°N 105.32100°W
- Area: less than one acre
- Built: 1953
- Architect: U.S. Bureau of Public Roads
- Architectural style: Concrete slab and girder
- MPS: Highway Bridges in Colorado MPS
- NRHP reference No.: 03000103
- Added to NRHP: March 11, 2003

The Boulder Creek Bridge near Boulder, Colorado is a concrete slab and girder bridge which was built in 1953. It was listed on the National Register of Historic Places in 2003.

It brings Colorado State Highway 119 over Boulder Creek, and was under Federal rather than state management as the highway provides access from Boulder to the Roosevelt National Forest.

It was designed by the U.S. Bureau of Public Roads. It is 100 feet (30 m) in total length, and 39 feet (12 m) wide carrying a 34 feet (10 m)-wide roadbed. It consists of three spans, the main one being 48 feet (15 m) long. It has concrete abutments, wingwalls, and spill-through piers. Steel flex beams on the approach were a later addition.

It was deemed technologically significant as one of the first concrete girder bridges in Colorado of a new type, having parabolically arched beams rather than flat ones, and supported by concrete spill through piers.
