= Ward, Colorado =

Town in Colorado, United States

- Home rule town
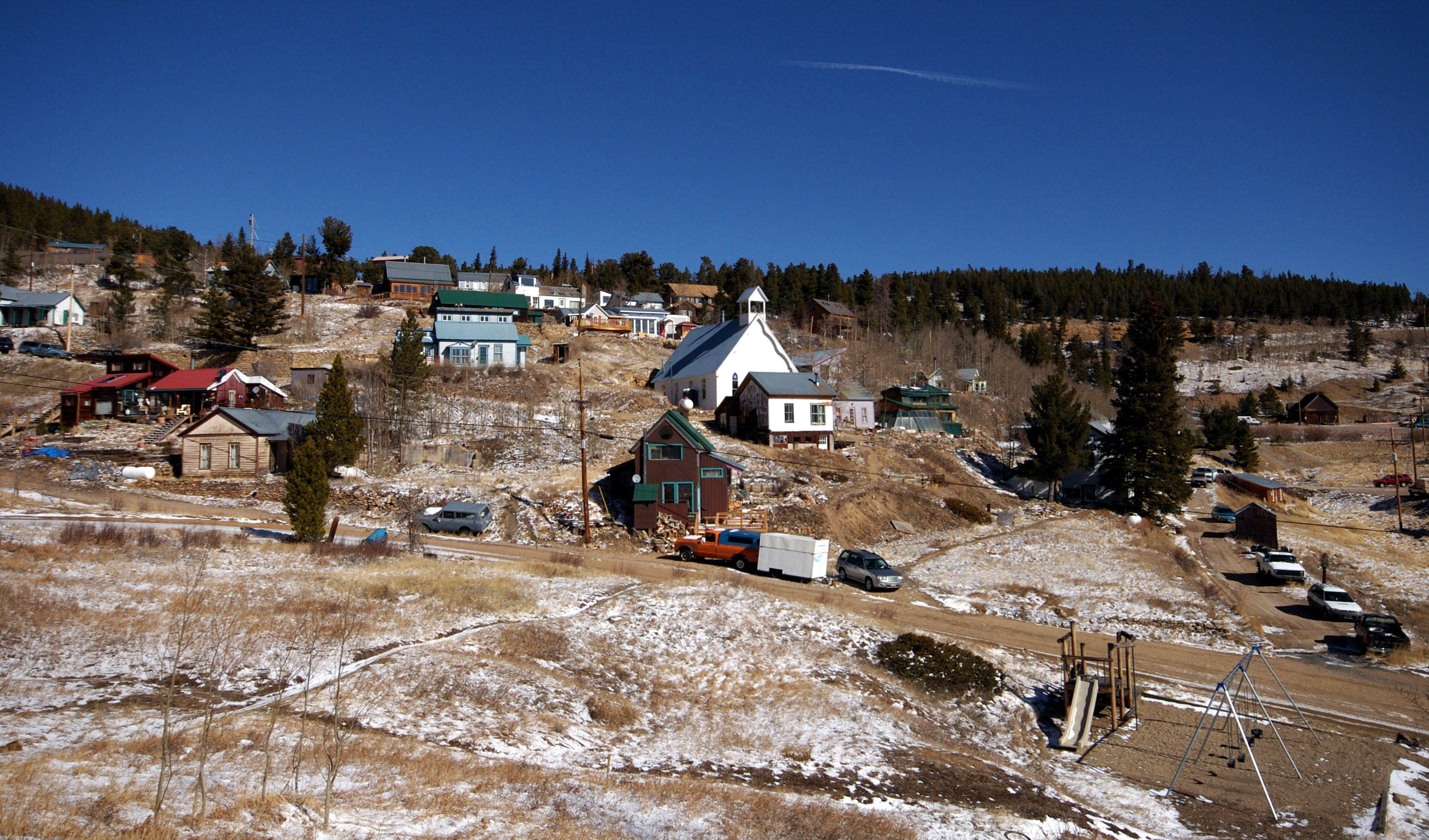

- Location of Ward in Boulder County, Colorado.
- Coordinates: 40°4′20″N 105°30′50″W
- Country: United States
- State: Colorado
- County: Boulder County
- Founded: 1860
- Incorporated: June 9, 1896

Government
  - Type: Home rule municipality

Area
  - Total: 0.54 sq mi (1.39 km^{2})
  - Land: 0.54 sq mi (1.39 km^{2})
  - Water: 0 sq mi (0.00 km^{2})
- Elevation: 9,462 ft (2,884 m)

Population (2020)
  - Total: 128
  - Density: 300.6/sq mi (116.08/km^{2})
- Time zone: UTC-7 (Mountain (MST))
  - Summer (DST): UTC-6 (MDT)
- ZIP Code: 80481
- Area code: 303
- FIPS code: 08-82735
- GNIS feature ID: 2413449
- Website: www.ward-co.org

Ward is a home rule municipality in Boulder County, Colorado, United States. The population was 128 at the 2020 census. The town is a former mining settlement founded in 1860 in the wake of the discovery of gold at nearby Gold Hill. Once one of the richest towns in the state during the Colorado Gold Rush, it is located on a mountainside at the top of Left Hand Canyon, near the Peak to Peak Highway (State Highway 72) northwest of Boulder at an elevation of 9,450 feet (2,880 m) above sea level.

== History ==
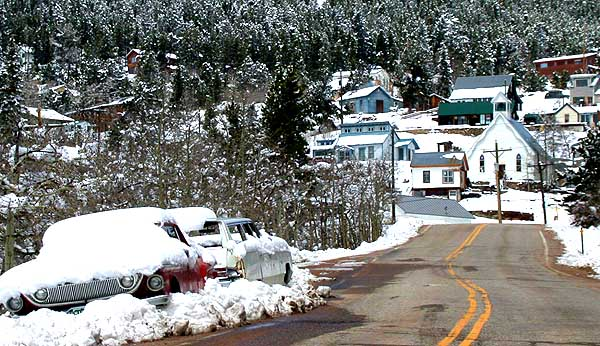
View of Ward from below along Lefthand Canyon Road

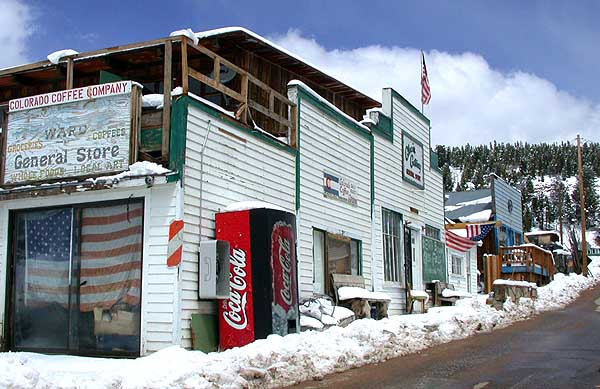
Businesses in Ward

The town was named for Calvin Ward, who prospected a claim in 1860 on the site known as Miser's Dream. The town boomed the following year with the discovery by Cyrus W. Deardorff of the Columbia vein. Over the next several decades the population fluctuated, growing from several hundred to several thousand before declining once again. The mines in the area remained profitable for many decades, with one mine eventually producing over 2 million troy ounces (62 t) of silver. A post office with the name Ward District was established January 13, 1863; the name was changed to Ward, September 11, 1894. The city was incorporated in June 1896. The railroad reached the area in 1898, arriving over the Whiplash and Switzerland Trail, which climbed over 4,000 feet (1,200 m) from Boulder over the course of 26 miles (42 km). In January 1900 over 50 buildings were destroyed by a devastating fire, although the profitability of the mines led to the immediate rebuilding of the town. The town was largely deserted by the 1920s, but the construction of the Peak-to-Peak Highway in the 1930s led to a revival of the town. During WWII the town's year-round population dropped to four people. Then, in the 1960s, the town's population jumped from between 10 and 20 year-round residents to well over 100 due to the town's interest to hippies.

The town has several businesses along its main street, including a restaurant, a coffee shop, an art gallery, and general store.

== Geography ==
According to the United States Census Bureau, the town has a total area of 0.6 square miles (1.6 km^{2}), all of it land.

== Demographics ==
Historical population
Census	Pop.	Note	%±
1890	424		—
1900	300		−29.2%
1910	129		−57.0%
1920	74		−42.6%
1930	34		−54.1%
1940	118		247.1%
1950	10		−91.5%
1960	9		−10.0%
1970	32		255.6%
1980	129		303.1%
1990	159		23.3%
2000	169		6.3%
2010	150		−11.2%
2020	128		−14.7%
U.S. Decennial Census

As of the census of 2010, there were 150 people, 75 households, and 36 families residing in the town. The population density was 296.9 inhabitants per square mile (114.6/km^{2}). There were 82 housing units at an average density of 144.1 units per square mile (55.6 units/km^{2}). The racial makeup of the town was 98.82% White, and 1.18% from two or more races.

There were 75 households, out of which 26.7% had children under the age of 18 living with them, 34.7% were married couples living together, 5.3% had a female householder with no husband present, and 52% were non-families. Of all households, 37.3% were made up of individuals, and 8% had someone living alone who was 65 years of age or older. The average household size was 2 and the average family size was 2.67.

The age of the town's populace was spread out, with 19.3% under the age of 18, 5.3% from 18 to 24, 32% from 25 to 44, 35.3% from 45 to 64, and 8% who were 65 years of age or older. The median age was 43.5 years. For every 100 females, there were 154.2 males. For every 100 females age 18 and over, there were 132.7 males.

In 2000, the median income for a household in the town was $33,750, and the median income for a family was $50,313. Males had a median income of $26,250 versus $28,750 for females. The per capita income for the town was $14,900. None of the population or families were below the poverty line.

== Notable people ==
- Hazel Schmoll, botanist

== See also ==
- 2013 Colorado floods
- Boulder, CO Metropolitan Statistical Area
- Denver-Aurora-Boulder, CO Combined Statistical Area
- Roosevelt National Forest
