= Allenspark, Colorado =

Census-designated place in Boulder County, Colorado, United States

- Census-designated place
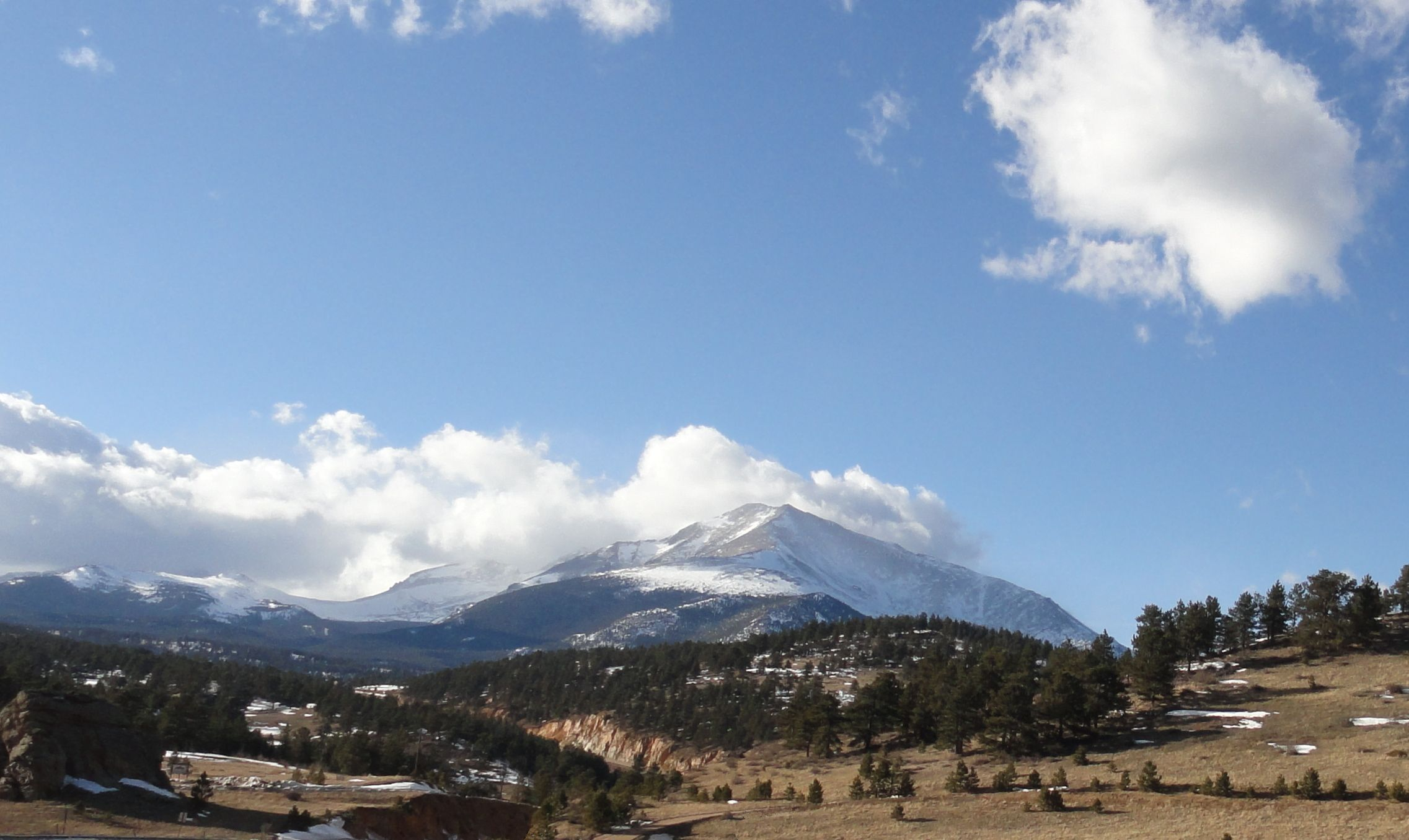
- Looking west toward Allenspark, Wild Basin and Mount Meeker in the background, Turkey Rock front left. DeWeese photo, 2014.

- Location of the Allenspark CDP in Boulder County, Colorado
- Coordinates: 40°12′26″N 105°30′02″W
- Country: United States
- State: Colorado
- County: Boulder

Government
  - Type: unincorporated community
  - Body: Boulder County

Area
  - Total: 11.940 sq mi (30.924 km^{2})
  - Land: 11.927 sq mi (30.891 km^{2})
  - Water: 0.013 sq mi (0.033 km^{2})
- Elevation: 8,429 ft (2,569 m)

Population (2020)
  - Total: 568
  - Density: 47.6/sq mi (18.4/km^{2})
- Time zone: UTC−07:00 (MST)
  - Summer (DST): UTC−06:00 (MDT)
- ZIP Code: 80510
- Area codes: 303/720/983
- GNIS CDP ID: 2407720
- FIPS code: 08-01420

Allenspark is an unincorporated community, a post office, and a census-designated place (CDP) located in and governed by Boulder County, Colorado, United States. The CDP is a part of the Boulder, CO Metropolitan Statistical Area. The Allenspark post office has the ZIP code 80510. At the 2020 United States census, the population of the Allenspark CDP was 568.

== History ==
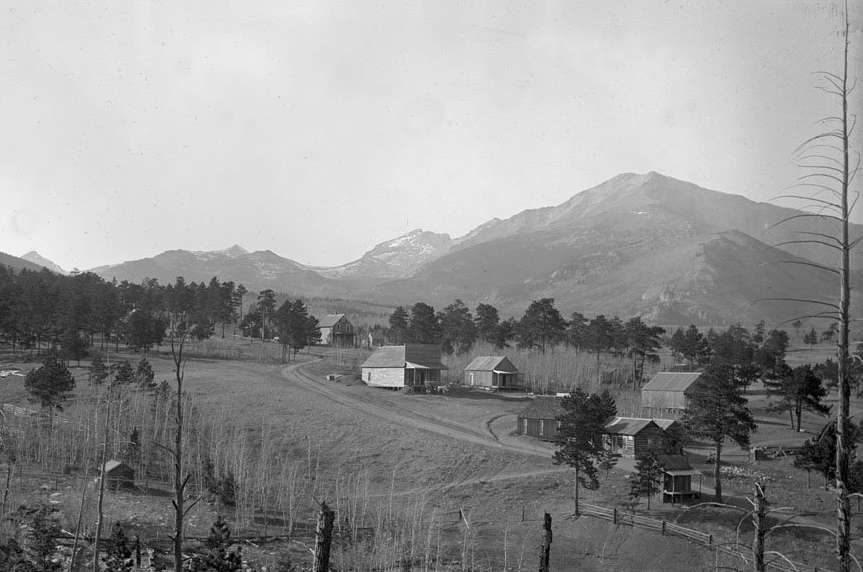
Allenspark, Colorado, circa 1907. Allenspark Hotel, Crystal Springs Lodge, and the Bishop family's two-story home at center. Mount Meeker in background.

Allenspark is a park in the geographical sense—it is a high meadow surrounded by mountains. While it was first visited by Native Americans and later by trappers, Allen's Park—now spelled Allenspark—got its name from a miner who built the first cabin in the area.

During the Colorado Gold Rush of 1859, Allenspark's namesake, Alonzo Nelson Allen, left his family in Columbus, Wisconsin, to seek his fortune in the Kansas/Nebraska Territories that became Colorado. He settled on the St. Vrain River, south of the current city of Longmont, Colorado.

Allen prospected and ran cattle in Allenspark and built a cabin there in 1864. The cabin burned down in 1894, the year Allen died.

The village of Allenspark is situated on part of the original George Mack homestead, site of Crystal Springs, an excellent water source. After Mack's homestead patent was granted on January 7, 1895, Mack sold some of the land to the Allens Park Land and Townsite Co. on May 9, 1896. The land company filed a plat for the village on May 23, 1896, and began selling small building lots. The Allenspark, Colorado, post office opened on August 18, 1896.

In Weaving Mountain Memories, Lorna Knowlton writes, "George Pheifer, a prominent early settler who came into Allenspark over the Stone Mountain Road from Lyons in 1896, said Allen never homesteaded his land but merely squatted on it in 1864. Pheifer said, 'All Alonzo Allen ever did for Allenspark was to give it a name.'"

In the late 1890s, most residents of the Allenspark area were farmers or ranchers, but by the early 1900s there was a resurgence in gold fever. The Clara Belle Mining and Reduction Co. attracted investors from as far away as Omaha, Nebraska, for what turned out to be a folly. Meanwhile, tourism was booming, and farmers and miners alike found a better income catering to tourists during the summer months. The first post office application was filed on May 29, 1896, by C.K. Hirshfeld.

The village of Allenspark began to grow when summer people bought land and built cabins from around 1900 to 1920. Many people came up the South St. Vrain canyon from Longmont, and a number came from as far away as Kansas and Oklahoma in that initial burst. The greater Allenspark area extends beyond the village to include the small communities of Ferncliff, Longs Peak, Meeker Park, Peaceful Valley, Raymond, and Riverside, and is defined by the boundaries of the Allenspark Fire Protection District.

Allenspark remained primarily a summer destination until improved roads and modern technology made mountain living easier than it used to be. Now, many people live year-round in the Allenspark area. In 2000, 500 residences were listed in the phone book. The 2010 census counted a total of 892 housing units, 267 of which were occupied on Census Day (April 1) and 577 of which were seasonally occupied.

Many businesses are still only open during the summer. Businesses include restaurants, lodges, summer camps, coffee shop, and gift shops. There is a filling station and grocery store in Ferncliff, however cell-phone coverage is nearly non-existent.

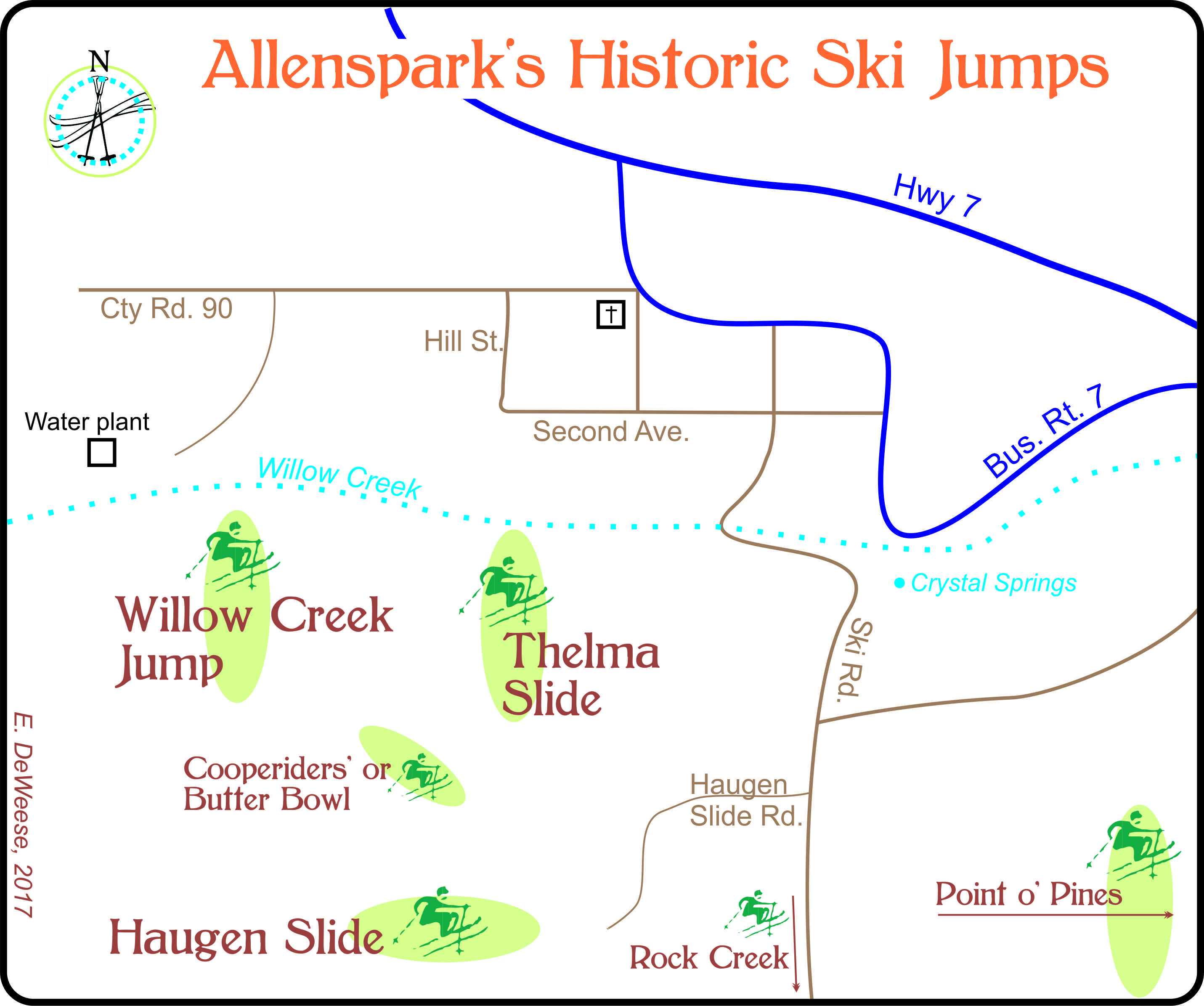
Map of Allenspark, Colorado, area ski jumps and slopes from the early to mid-Twentieth Century. copyright, Edie DeWeese, 2019.

Skiing was popular in the Allenspark area in the 1920s and 1930s, when international ski jumping competitions were held. Jumps and ski courses included the Willow Creek Slide, Thelma Slide, Butter Bowl, Haugen Slide, and Point-O-Pines. The Rock Creek Ski area was developed after World War II and operated until 1952. Cross-country skiing is still popular, especially on Rock Creek and in Wild Basin.

== Geography ==
Allenspark is located in northwest Boulder County within Roosevelt National Forest in the Front Range of the Colorado Rockies. The western edge of the community is the boundary of Rocky Mountain National Park. State Highway 7 passes through the community, leading north 15 miles (24 km) to Estes Park and east 19 miles (31 km) to Lyons.

At the 2020 United States census, the Allenspark CDP had an area of 7,641 acres (30.924 km^{2}) including 8.2 acres (0.033 km^{2}) of water.

=== Climate ===
Climate data for Allenspark 3NW, Colorado, 1991–2020 normals: 8500ft (2591m)
Month	Jan	Feb	Mar	Apr	May	Jun	Jul	Aug	Sep	Oct	Nov	Dec	Year
Record high °F (°C)	59 (15)	55 (13)	65 (18)	70 (21)	82 (28)	85 (29)	90 (32)	87 (31)	83 (28)	74 (23)	67 (19)	55 (13)	90 (32)
Mean maximum °F (°C)	50.9 (10.5)	50.4 (10.2)	57.2 (14.0)	63.0 (17.2)	74.2 (23.4)	80.2 (26.8)	86.1 (30.1)	83.1 (28.4)	78.3 (25.7)	68.4 (20.2)	57.5 (14.2)	50.2 (10.1)	86.3 (30.2)
Mean daily maximum °F (°C)	32.2 (0.1)	34.5 (1.4)	41.7 (5.4)	46.1 (7.8)	56.0 (13.3)	68.6 (20.3)	74.3 (23.5)	72.7 (22.6)	65.7 (18.7)	52.4 (11.3)	40.6 (4.8)	33.4 (0.8)	51.5 (10.8)
Daily mean °F (°C)	23.2 (−4.9)	24.6 (−4.1)	31.0 (−0.6)	34.4 (1.3)	44.1 (6.7)	53.3 (11.8)	59.3 (15.2)	57.7 (14.3)	51.1 (10.6)	40.6 (4.8)	30.5 (−0.8)	23.8 (−4.6)	39.5 (4.1)
Mean daily minimum °F (°C)	14.1 (−9.9)	14.7 (−9.6)	20.3 (−6.5)	22.8 (−5.1)	32.2 (0.1)	38.1 (3.4)	44.3 (6.8)	42.7 (5.9)	36.5 (2.5)	28.7 (−1.8)	20.3 (−6.5)	14.1 (−9.9)	27.4 (−2.6)
Mean minimum °F (°C)	−7.1 (−21.7)	−8.5 (−22.5)	−1.7 (−18.7)	6.4 (−14.2)	20.0 (−6.7)	28.4 (−2.0)	36.0 (2.2)	35.2 (1.8)	20.0 (−6.7)	12.1 (−11.1)	−0.6 (−18.1)	−3.5 (−19.7)	−15.5 (−26.4)
Record low °F (°C)	−21 (−29)	−23 (−31)	−23 (−31)	−8 (−22)	10 (−12)	23 (−5)	31 (−1)	31 (−1)	11 (−12)	3 (−16)	−15 (−26)	−17 (−27)	−23 (−31)
Average precipitation inches (mm)	1.44 (37)	1.38 (35)	3.11 (79)	3.61 (92)	3.06 (78)	1.83 (46)	2.41 (61)	2.69 (68)	2.21 (56)	1.14 (29)	1.44 (37)	0.84 (21)	25.16 (639)
Average snowfall inches (cm)	20.8 (53)	18.2 (46)	34.0 (86)	36.9 (94)	12.0 (30)	1.8 (4.6)	trace	0.0 (0.0)	7.3 (19)	9.2 (23)	18.8 (48)	12.7 (32)	171.7 (435.6)
Source 1: NOAA
Source 2: XMACIS (1991-2003 snowfall, records & monthly max/mins)

== Demographics ==
The United States Census Bureau initially defined the Aetna Estates CDP for the 2000 United States census.

Allenspark CDP, Colorado
Year	Pop.	±%
2000	496	—
2010	528	+6.5%
2020	568	+7.6%
Source: United States Census Bureau

== See also ==
- Longs Peak
- Wind River Pass
