= Louisville, Colorado =

City in Colorado, United States

- Home rule municipality
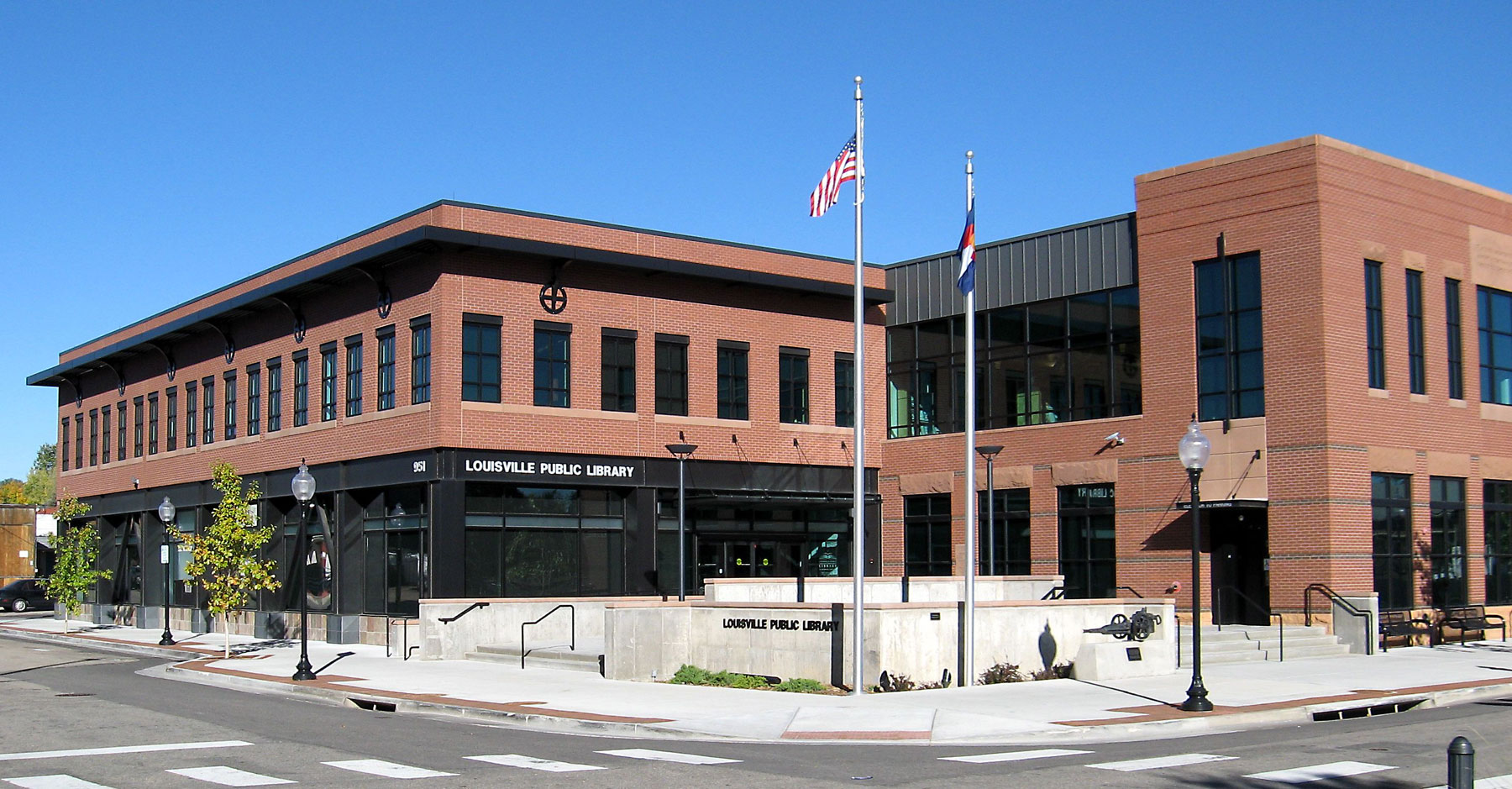
- The Louisville Public Library, built in 2006 (American Institute of Architects Award, 2007)

- Logo

- Location of the City of Louisville in Boulder County, Colorado
- Coordinates: 39°58′14″N 105°07′50″W
- Country: United States
- State: Colorado
- County: Boulder County
- City: Louisville
- Settled: 1877
- Incorporated: June 3, 1882

Government
  - Type: Home rule municipality

Area
  - Total: 8.07 sq mi (20.89 km^{2})
  - Land: 7.95 sq mi (20.60 km^{2})
  - Water: 0.11 sq mi (0.29 km^{2})
- Elevation: 5,401 ft (1,646 m)

Population (2020)
  - Total: 21,226
  - Density: 2,669/sq mi (1,030/km^{2})
- Time zone: UTC−7 (MST)
  - Summer (DST): UTC−6 (MDT)
- ZIP codes: 80027-80028
- Area codes: 303, 720
- FIPS code: 08-46355
- GNIS feature ID: 2410884
- Highways: US 36, SH 42, Northwest Parkway NW Parkway
- Website: www.louisvilleco.gov

The City of Louisville (/ˈluːɪsvɪl/) is a home rule municipality located in southeastern Boulder County, Colorado, United States. The city population was 21,226 at the 2020 United States census. Louisville began as a mining community in 1877, experienced a period of labor violence early in the 20th century, and transitioned to a suburban residential community when the mines closed in the 1950s.

== History ==
The town of Louisville dates back to the start of the Welch Mine in 1877, the first coal mine in an area of Boulder and Weld counties known as the Northern Coalfield. The town was named for Louis Nawatny, a local landowner who platted his land and named it for himself. Incorporation came several years later in 1882.

The Northern Coalfield proved to be highly productive, and eventually, some 30 different mines operated within the current boundaries of Louisville, though not all at the same time. During the years of peak production (1907–09), 12 mines were in operation in Louisville, including the Acme Mine whose two million tons of coal came from directly beneath the center of town. The presence of many independent mining companies in Louisville saved the town from becoming a "company town", wholly owned and dominated by a single mining company.

Coal from the Northern Coalfield was sub-bituminous (low grade) and could not be transported long distances because of problems with self-combustion. Mining generally took place in the winter months since that was the period that demanded fuel for heating. During the summers, the miners played in local baseball leagues, with the home field named "Miners Field".

A great deal of mythology has arisen around the stories of tunnels that connected saloons throughout the city, but these have proven to be unfounded and undocumented. Instead, during labor conflicts, many citizens found refuge in dirt basements to avoid errant bullets being fired from mine compounds into the city. From 1910 to 1914, the Northern Colorado Coalfields were in the midst of a strike by the United Mine Workers and the Rocky Mountain Fuel Company based on working conditions, pay, and working hours. When miners walked out on the Hecla Mine northeast of Louisville, the company hired the Baldwin–Felts Detective Agency to guard the mine compound. A machine gun and spotlight were placed in a tower on the Hecla property, and when miners took out their frustration by shooting their guns at the compound, the detectives responded by returning their fire by randomly firing at the town. The northernmost engagement of the Colorado Coalfield War occurred in Louisville between a small contingent of Colorado National Guard and Baldwin-Felts, led by Captain Hildreth Frost against strikers following the Ludlow Massacre in April 1914.

Eventually, the coal remaining in the Northern Coalfield became increasingly uneconomical to mine, and the last coal mines operating in Louisville closed in the 1950s.

In 2001, the city changed from a statutory city and became a home rule city. The home rule debate came about when Xcel Energy announced plans to replace old power line poles with much larger steel towers. While the city wanted the power lines to be buried, it discovered it lacked the authority to force Xcel to do this or even to create a taxing district to fund such.

=== Marshall Fire ===
In late December 2021, the Marshall Fire raged through the parched lands near Boulder, Colorado. The Marshall Fire would prove to be the most destructive in Colorado's history to date. The fire impacted City of Louisville, Town of Superior and unincorporated Boulder County areas. Within Louisville, 553 homes were destroyed with an additional 45 damaged. Over 21,000 people in Louisville and 13,000 in Superior were ultimately evacuated while the fire was spreading due to unusual 100-mile-per-hour winds. Additionally, two people died in the fire. The cause of the fire has not been officially announced, pending an investigation. However, an incident report filed by a ranger with Boulder Open Space and Mountain Parks identified two ignition points for the fire. The first ignition point was a shed that began to burn at approximately 11:30AM MST, December 30, 2021. The second ignition point was upwind from the first, and started around noon of the same day on "western side of the Marshall Mesa trailhead."

== Geography ==
Louisville is located in southeastern Boulder County. U.S. Highway 36 (the Denver-Boulder Turnpike) forms the southwestern border of the city.

According to the United States Census Bureau, the city has a total area of 8.0 square miles (20.7 km^{2}), of which 7.9 square miles (20.4 km^{2}) is land and 0.12 square miles (0.3 km^{2}), or 1.35%, is water.

== Demographics ==
Historical population
Census	Pop.	Note	%±
1880	450		—
1890	596		32.4%
1900	966		62.1%
1910	1,706		76.6%
1920	1,799		5.5%
1930	1,681		−6.6%
1940	2,023		20.3%
1950	1,978		−2.2%
1960	2,073		4.8%
1970	2,409		16.2%
1980	5,593		132.2%
1990	12,361		121.0%
2000	18,937		53.2%
2010	18,376		−3.0%
2020	21,226		15.5%
2023 (est.)	20,390	▼	−3.9%
U.S. Decennial Census

=== 2020 census ===
As of the 2020 census, Louisville had a population of 21,226. The median age was 42.4 years. 22.1% of residents were under the age of 18 and 17.1% of residents were 65 years of age or older. For every 100 females there were 95.9 males, and for every 100 females age 18 and over there were 93.8 males age 18 and over.

99.7% of residents lived in urban areas, while 0.3% lived in rural areas.

There were 8,628 households in Louisville, of which 31.2% had children under the age of 18 living in them. Of all households, 53.5% were married-couple households, 16.9% were households with a male householder and no spouse or partner present, and 23.8% were households with a female householder and no spouse or partner present. About 27.3% of all households were made up of individuals and 11.8% had someone living alone who was 65 years of age or older.

There were 8,929 housing units, of which 3.4% were vacant. The homeowner vacancy rate was 0.5% and the rental vacancy rate was 3.7%.

Racial composition as of the 2020 census
Race	Number	Percent
White	17,681	83.3%
Black or African American	168	0.8%
American Indian and Alaska Native	77	0.4%
Asian	929	4.4%
Native Hawaiian and Other Pacific Islander	13	0.1%
Some other race	495	2.3%
Two or more races	1,863	8.8%
Hispanic or Latino (of any race)	1,737	8.2%

== Economy ==
Rogue Wave Software, a software development company, and the Space Systems component of Sierra Space, a prime systems integrator for commercial spacecraft, formerly was located in Louisville.

== Arts and culture ==
Louisville's historical downtown includes Steinbaugh Pavilion, which is used for a concert venue during the summer Louisville Street Faire, which runs on Friday nights and features local bands and street vendors and an ice rink in the winter months. There is also a farmers' market that runs on Saturdays from May to October along the 800 block of Front Street, centered around the Steinbaugh Pavilion. The TBS sitcom, The Bill Engvall Show, was set in Louisville. The city has about 32 miles of recreational trails.

== Education ==
There are six public schools, six private schools, and one public library in Louisville. The public secondary schools are Monarch High School, Monarch K-8, and Louisville Middle School. Nearby higher education institutions include University of Colorado at Boulder, Naropa University, and Front Range Community College (in Longmont and Westminster).

From 2003 to 2010, Louisville was home to the National Education Center of the National Institute for Trial Advocacy and was also home to NITA's headquarters from 2006 to 2010. In 2021, NITA moved its headquarters from Boulder back to Louisville.

Formerly St. Louis School, affiliated with the Archdiocese of Denver, was in Louisville. It was scheduled to close permanently in 2026. Several area parents contacted the leadership of the Roman Catholic Church in the Vatican City to try to keep the school open. The Dicastery for Culture and Education ultimately affirmed the school's closure.

== Health care ==
There are two hospitals in the city, AdventHealth Avista and Centennial Peaks Hospital.

== See also ==
- Front Range Urban Corridor
- Denver metropolitan area
