= Colorado Connector =

Future train service in Colorado

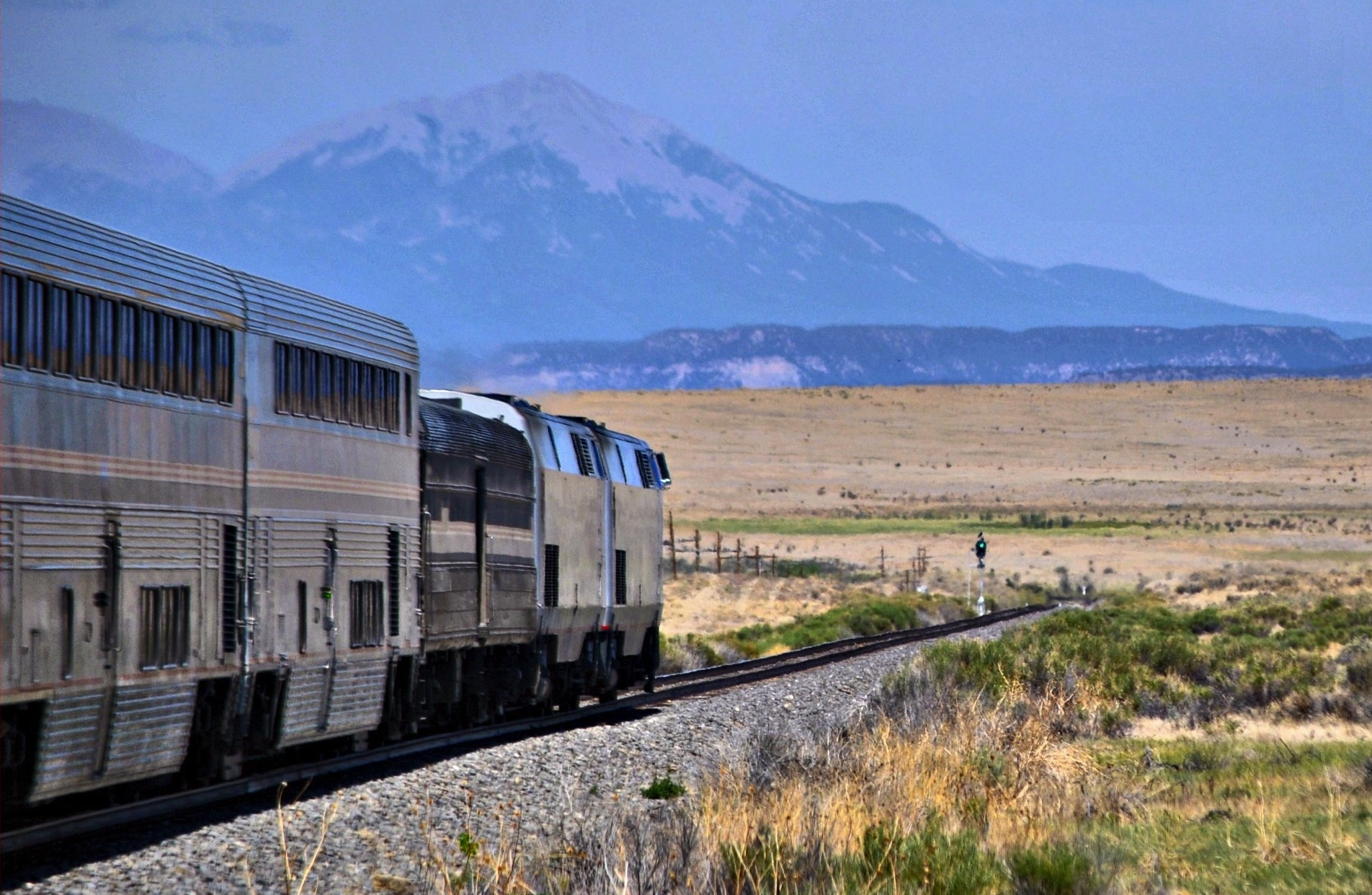
- A long-distance Amtrak train in Colorado

Overview
- Service type: Inter-city rail
- Status: Planned
- Locale: Colorado
- First service: 2029 (Denver-Fort Collins, planned); 2032 (full service)
- Current operator: Amtrak (planned)
- Website: coloradoconnector.com www.frprdistrict.com

Technical
- Track gauge: 4 ft 8 1/2 in (1,435 mm) standard gauge
- Operating speed: 79 mph (127 km/h) (planned top)

The Colorado Connector (CoCo), also known as Front Range Passenger Rail, is a planned intercity passenger train service along Colorado's Front Range corridor with major stops in Fort Collins, Boulder, Denver, Colorado Springs, and Pueblo. The train is expected to be operated by Amtrak with state support over existing tracks owned by BNSF and Union Pacific.

Per the delivery plan adopted in 2026, the Colorado Connector will be implemented in two primary phases. Phase one will consist of three daily round trips between Denver and Fort Collins by 2029. Phase two will increase frequency and extend service south to Pueblo by mid-2032. Both phases are fully funded, with sales tax revenue for phase two approved by voters in November 2026.

Front Range communities were historically connected by rail transit until the mid-20th century. A series of studies performed since the early 2000s showed mounting interest in renewed service. The modern effort to implement a Front Range train began in 2021, when Amtrak included the route in its expansion vision. In 2021, the Colorado General Assembly created the Front Range Passenger Rail District to oversee the project. The district's work has since resulted in a delivery plan, branding package, and ballot measure.

Past proposals for a Front Range train have called for service north to Cheyenne, Wyoming, and south to Trinidad, Colorado; Albuquerque, New Mexico; and El Paso, Texas, but these options are not planned as of 2026.

== History ==
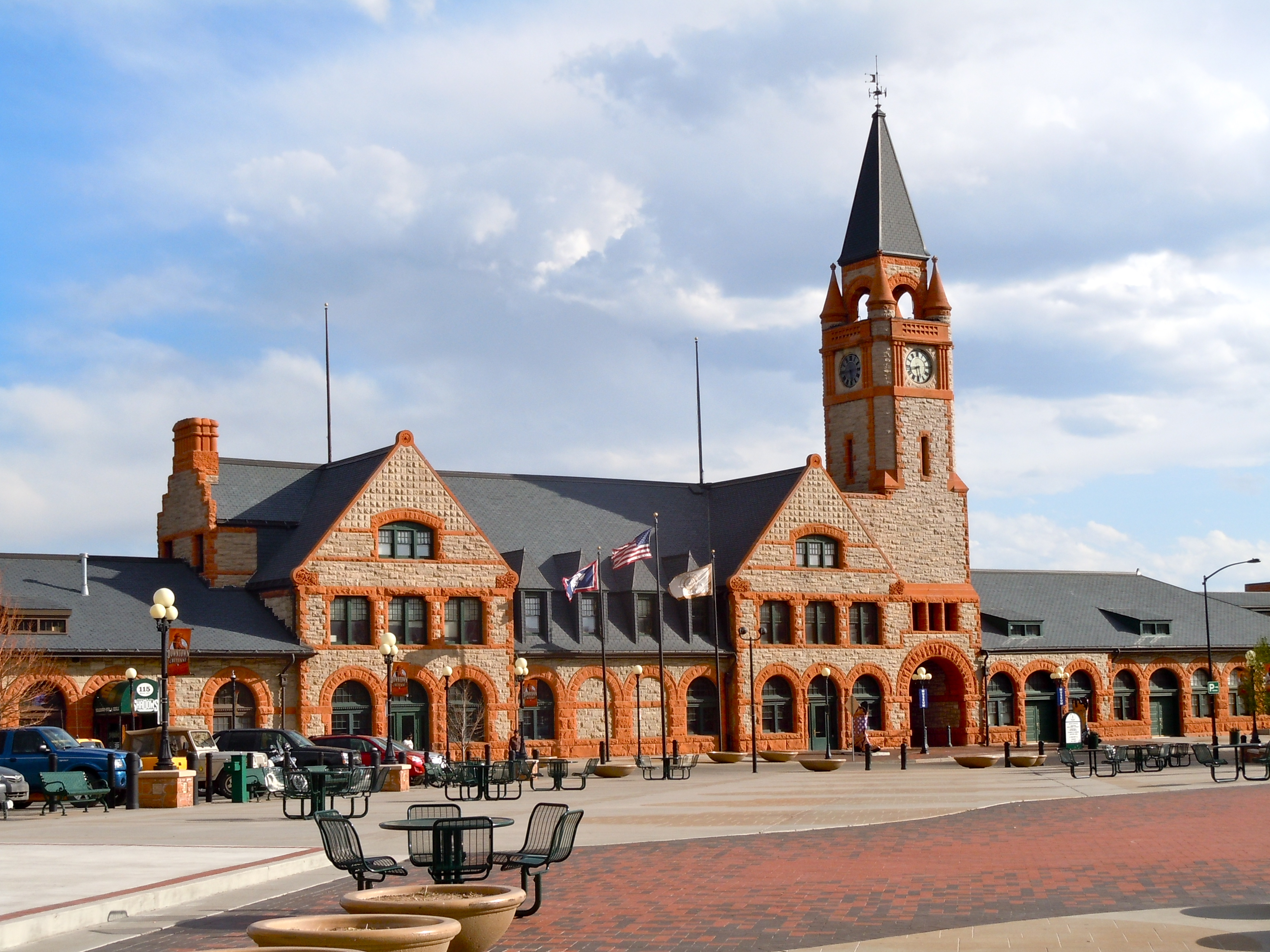
Cheyenne Depot, now a railroad museum

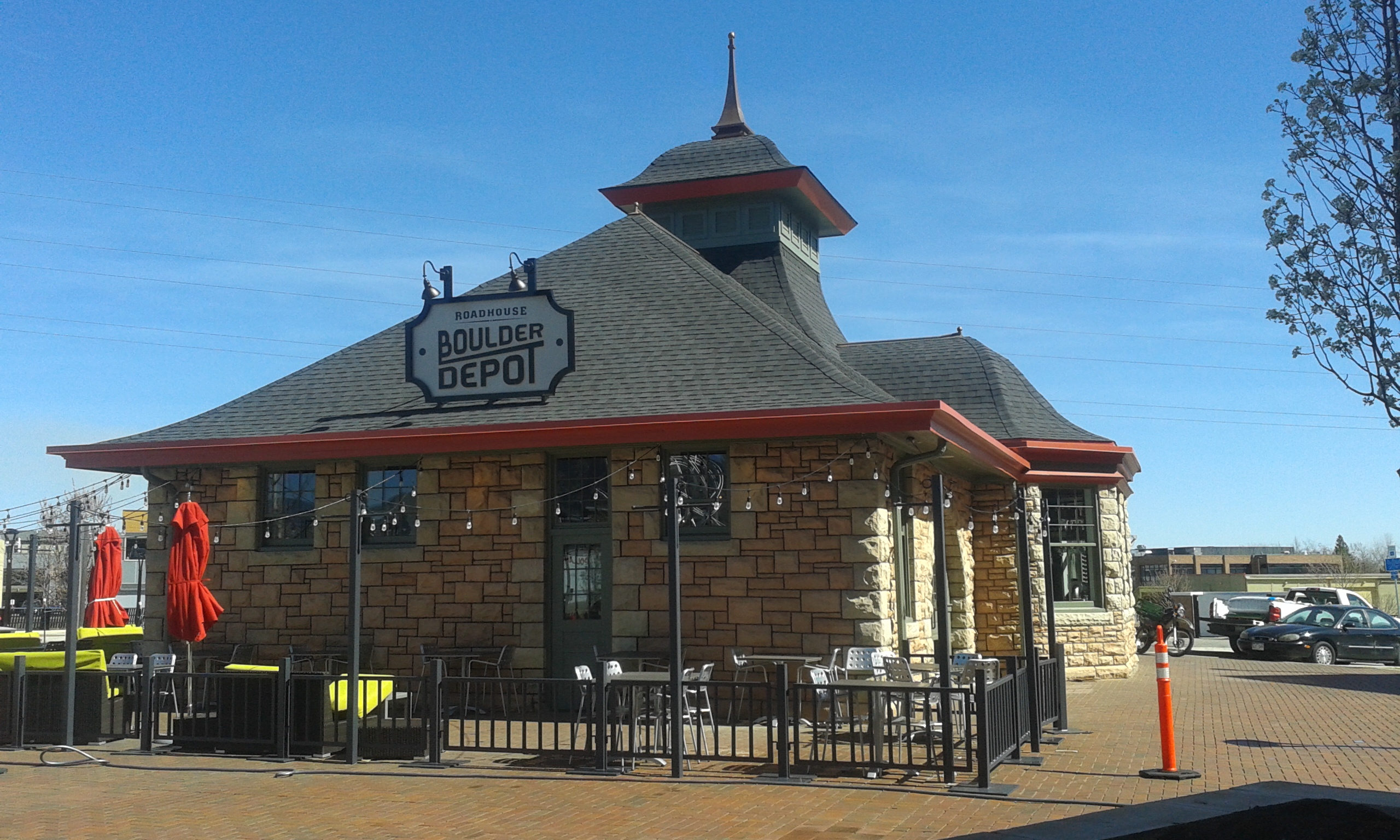
Boulder Depot, now a restaurant

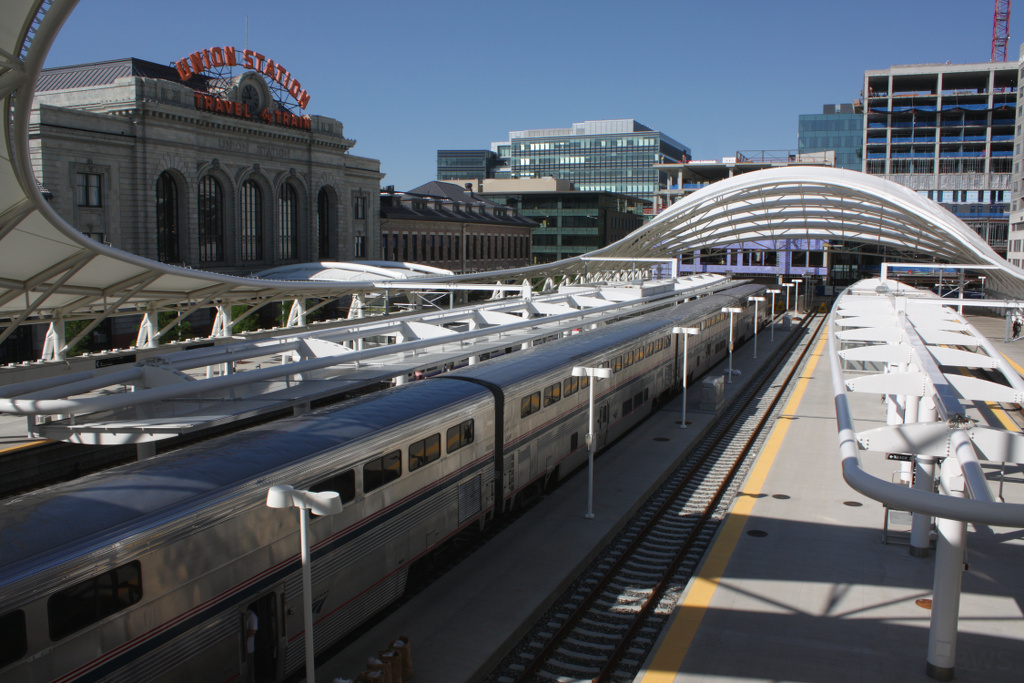
Denver Union Station, served by Amtrak's California Zephyr and Winter Park Express

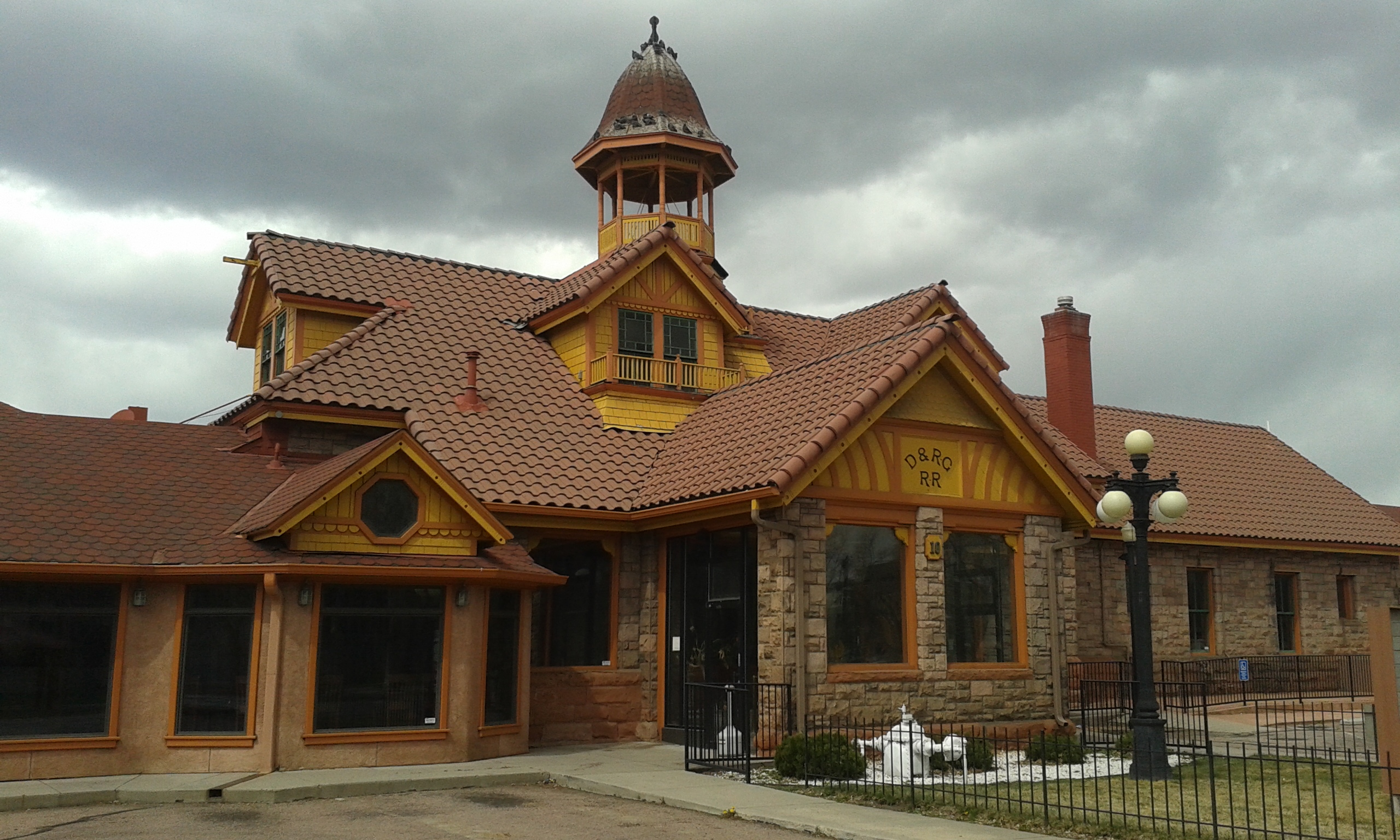
D&RGW Depot in Colorado Springs, now a shopping center

Pueblo Union Depot, a proposed southern terminus for Front Range service

In the 19th century, the Atchison, Topeka and Santa Fe Railway and Denver and Rio Grande Western Railroad built lines along the Front Range that are now owned by BNSF and Union Pacific. Pueblo–Denver passenger service existed until the formation of Amtrak in 1971. The Denver–Cheyenne segment was last served in 1997 by the Pioneer.

In 1989, rail supporters involved in preserving Denver Union Station formed the nonprofit Colorado Rail Passenger Association (ColoRail). The group has regularly advocated for the Front Range route, and in 1997 played a role in starting Amtrak Thruway bus service along the corridor from Denver to Raton.

With the 1998 Transportation Equity Act for the 21st Century, Congress authorized the US Department of Transportation to designate eleven federal high-speed rail corridors for targeted development. Ten were listed by the December 2001 funding deadline, though none in the mountain west. In March 2002, the Colorado Department of Transportation (CDOT) nevertheless applied for designation of the "Rocky Mountain High Speed Rail Corridor" along I-25 and I-70. The corridor has yet to be designated as of 2024.

=== Rocky Mountain Rail Authority ===
In December 2004, Colorado State Representative Bob Briggs of Westminster founded the Front Range Commuter Rail organization. The stated goal of the organization was to start commuter rail along the Front Range by the time the Regional Transportation District's FasTracks mass transit started service in 2014. The proposed line was dubbed the "RangerXpress" and received high-profile support from Colorado Senator Ken Salazar.

In September 2006, the Colorado Transportation Commission approved a $1,246,000 grant for a high-speed rail feasibility study on corridors in Colorado, including the Front Range. Although Front Range Commuter Rail had applied for the grant, CDOT required that the money go to a local government body. To this end, several counties and municipalities in Colorado formed the Rocky Mountain Rail Authority (RMRA) that November. The authority eventually grew to 45 members. By May 2007, the RMRA had raised over $415,000 in matching funds, exceeding the required 20% match on the CDOT grant. RMRA committed the final $325,000 the following month.

Work on the RMRA study began in June 2008 and it was released in March 2010. It found that the I-25 corridor would meet the Federal Railroad Administration (FRA) criteria for technical and economic feasibility, including positive cost-benefit and farebox recovery ratios.

In July 2011, the Colorado Secretary of State marked Front Range Commuter Rail as a delinquent organization effective June 1, 2010.

=== Division of Transit and Rail ===
In May 2009, Colorado Governor Bill Ritter signed a bill creating the Division of Transit and Rail (DTR) within CDOT. The division is responsible for developing rail services and administering state and federal rail funds in Colorado. In March 2012, DTR released its first Colorado Freight and Passenger Rail Plan, which was required by the Passenger Rail Investment and Improvement Act of 2008 in order for Colorado to receive future FRA grants. The plan lists various versions of Front Range service as long-range projects.

In April 2012, CDOT began an Interregional Connectivity Study (ICS) through an FRA grant, building on the 2010 RMRA study. Published in January 2014, the ICS recommended initial high-speed rail service between Fort Collins, Denver International Airport, and Briargate—a neighborhood of northern Colorado Springs—with future expansion to Pueblo. This alignment would bypass Boulder and downtown Denver via a new rail line built along the Colorado 470 beltway. The startup cost of the project was estimated at $9.81 billion with annual ridership of 13.6 million.

In July 2015, CDOT began operating Bustang, an intercity bus service with several routes along the Front Range corridor.

In July 2016, the Regional Transportation District (RTD) opened the initial 6.2-mile (10 km) section of the Northwest Rail B Line from Denver to Westminster. An unfunded extension to Boulder and Longmont is planned for the 2040s. This commuter rail line overlaps part of the route that later emerged as the favorite for Front Range Passenger Rail.

=== Rail Commission ===
In spring 2017, Colorado enacted legislation creating the Southwest Chief & Front Range Passenger Rail Commission, effective July 1 of that year. The commission subsumed a body focused solely on supporting the long-distance Southwest Chief, taking on the additional task of developing passenger rail on the I-25 corridor. It is composed of representatives from CDOT, RTD, ColoRail, Amtrak, BNSF, Union Pacific, and various Colorado governments. In 2018 the General Assembly allocated $2.5 million toward the commission's duties, including development of a Front Range Passenger Rail service plan.

CDOT updated the Colorado Freight and Passenger Rail Plan in 2018, naming Front Range Passenger Rail a "priority objective" and "Colorado's most immediate opportunity to improve and expand rail mobility." The Division of Transit and Rail committed to advancing the project.

In December 2020, the Rail Commission published an "Alternatives Analysis" that identified three feasible routes for the Pueblo–Fort Collins segment of Front Range service. The alternatives consisted of nine initial stations, 18 to 24 round trips per day, speeds up to 110 miles per hour (180 km/h), and end-to-end travel times of 2.5 to 3 hours. Annual ridership was estimated at 2.2 million and startup costs at $7.8 to $14.5 billion.

In spring 2021, Amtrak included the Front Range route in its 2035 expansion vision. As envisioned, the service would consist of three daily round trips between Pueblo and Fort Collins with one extending to Cheyenne. The end-to-end trip time would be 5 hours 34 minutes and the route would have an annual economic impact of $103 million. This would be a state-supported Amtrak route similar to Illinois Service or NC By Train, meaning Colorado and Wyoming would shoulder much of the operating cost.

=== Rail District ===
In June 2021, Colorado Governor Jared Polis signed a bill creating the Front Range Passenger Rail District in a ceremony at Pueblo Union Depot. The district spans nine counties of the I-25 corridor in Colorado. It is overseen by a board of stakeholders similar to those of the Southwest Chief & Front Range Passenger Rail Commission, which the district officially replaced on July 1, 2022. The board can ask voters to approve a new sales tax up to 0.8% within the district to pay for the train service, but only after making every effort to secure federal funding.

In October 2021, the Colorado Transportation Commission approved the final $1.6 million of the $3.9 million needed for new Front Range service studies. The FRA had already awarded a $685,000 grant and the rest came from the Rail Commission. The studies were to take about two years and result in a workable service plan that the Rail District can use to secure funding. The project would still need separate environmental review.

In November 2021, Congress passed President Biden's Infrastructure Investment and Jobs Act (IIJA), which allocates $215 million to public transportation in Colorado, $66 billion to Amtrak, and tens of billions to competitive transportation grant programs. Advocates considered Front Range Passenger Rail well-positioned to benefit from these funds. In May 2022, the FRA launched the Corridor Identification and Development Program as the mechanism for new passenger rail projects to receive funds from the IIJA. Colorado's four Democratic House members sent a letter to USDOT and the FRA requesting that Front Range service be funded by the program. In December 2023, the Fort Collins–Pueblo route was accepted into the Corridor ID program and was granted $500,000 toward development.

In June 2022, Colorado allocated nearly $9 million in "early stage Front Range Passenger Rail funding": $2.4 million to the rail district, providing matching dollars for federal contributions; and $6.5 million to the Burnham rail yard redevelopment project in Denver. The move was intended to help make Colorado competitive for federal IIJA funding.

In September 2023, Polis was pushing to put a funding measure for Front Range service on the ballot as soon as November 2024. Planners were working on a service development plan which will finalize the proposed route, station stops, and frequency, while estimating timeline and cost.

In May 2024, Governor Polis signed SB24-184, a transportation funding bill that ordered the Rail District to submit a report by March 2025 that outlines a plan to begin passenger service by January 1, 2029. The law also authorized the Rail District, RTD, and CDOT to enter into an intergovernmental agreement to provide joint service on the "first phase" of Front Range service, which would run from Denver north to Fort Collins. Further, the law included a $3 per day increase in rental car fees to help provide matching dollars for federal rail funding without increasing taxes.

In October 2024, the FRA granted Colorado $66 million as part of a Consolidated Rail Infrastructure and Safety Improvements (CRISI) grant to CDOT to upgrade the BNSF trackage between Westminster and Broomfield, Colorado, by adding Positive Train Control (PTC), improving the track, and adding a siding. The money also will improve five "high priority" crossings in Larimer and Boulder counties. The state of Colorado provided $27 million to match the grant. While this is a general rail safety upgrade, this is widely expected to help lay the groundwork for Front Range Passenger Rail with Governor Polis saying the grant will "accelerate the timeline".

In April 2025, U.S. Representative Lauren Boebert asked the Department of Government Efficiency (DOGE) to reevaluate federal funding from the rail project, purporting it to be a waste of tax money that infringed on landowners' rights and operated with a lack of transparency. Polis' office released a statement debunking Boebert's claims, saying that the federal government has provided less than $2 million to the project and adding that his office did not expect any federal funds to be used. In June 2025, the RTD board approved the joint service intergovernmental agreement to work with the Rail District in providing passenger service between Denver and Fort Collins.

==== Colorado Connector ====
In April 2026, the Colorado state government announced that the proposed service would be named the Colorado Connector (CoCo). A public poll with 26,000 votes had chosen the name from among four finalists; the other entries were Front Range Express Destinations (FRED), Colorado Ranger, and RangeLink. Governor Jared Polis announced that the first phase of the Colorado Connector would begin operations in 2029, and full service would open within five years of the initial segment if a ballot measure funding the CoCo was passed that year.

In July 2026, the Front Range Passenger Rail District Board unanimously approved a two phase delivery plan for Colorado Connector service. Phase one would be implemented with existing funds and consist of three daily round trips between Denver and Fort Collins by 2029. Phase two would increase frequency and extend service south to Pueblo by mid-2032, pending voter approval of a 0.333% sales tax increase within the rail district. Phase two funding became Ballot Issue 7A, which voters approved in the November 2026 election. The measure incorrectly appeared in four counties outside the rail district.

Colorado Ballot Issue 7A November 3, 2026
| Choice | Votes | % |
|---|---|---|
| For | 625,015 | 55.78 |
| Against | 495,438 | 44.22 |
| Total | 1,120,453 | 100.00 |

=== New Mexico and Texas ===
In 2003, New Mexico Governor Bill Richardson announced plans for the Rail Runner Express, a commuter train between Belen, Albuquerque, and Santa Fe. To ensure passenger trains would have priority over freight, the state signed a $76 million agreement with BNSF in December 2005 to buy the line between Belen and Lamy. As part of the deal, BNSF insisted that the state also buy the line from Lamy to Trinidad, Colorado, that hosts the Southwest Chief and has been included in some plans for Front Range Passenger Rail expansion. Governor Susana Martinez cancelled the purchase of this part of the line in March 2016.

The American Recovery and Reinvestment Act of 2009 appropriated new funding for high-speed rail projects, renewing interest a possible "Rocky Mountain High Speed Rail Corridor". Colorado, New Mexico, and Texas sought designation for the Denver–Albuquerque–El Paso section of the I-25 corridor. In July 2009, in hopes of conducting a feasibility study, the states applied for $5 million in funds made available by the Passenger Rail Investment and Improvement Act of 2008. No study materialized.

In February 2024, a long-distance route between El Paso and Billings via Denver was proposed by the Federal Railroad Administration as part of the Long-Distance Service Study.

== Proposed route ==
| Station | Community | To open | Connections |
|---|---|---|---|
| Fort Collins station | Fort Collins | 2029 | MAX BRT; Transfort |
| Loveland station | Loveland | 2029 | City of Loveland Transit |
| Longmont station | Longmont | 2029 | RTD Bus |
| Boulder station | Boulder | 2029 | RTD Flatiron Flyer; RTD Bus, Boulder HOP |
| Louisville station | Louisville | 2029 | RTD Bus |
| Broomfield station | Broomfield | 2029 | RTD: (proposed); RTD Bus; RTD Flatiron Flyer |
| Westminster station | Westminster | 2029 | RTD: RTD Bus |
| Denver Union Station | Denver | 2029 | Amtrak: California Zephyr, Winter Park Express (winter only); Rocky Mountaineer: Canyon Spirit, Rockies to the Red Rocks; RTD: RTD Bus, RTD MallRide, RTD MetroRide; RTD Flatiron Flyer; Intercity bus: Amtrak Thruway, Greyhound Lines, Burlington Trailways, Bustang, Express Arrow |
| Broncos Stadium station | Denver | TBD | RTD: RTD Bus |
| South Broadway station | Denver | TBD | TBD |
| Littleton station | Littleton | 2032 | RTD: RTD Bus |
| Sterling Ranch station | Sterling Ranch | 2032 | TBD |
| North Colorado Springs station | Colorado Springs | 2032 | TBD |
| Colorado Springs station | Colorado Springs | 2032 | TBD |
| Pueblo station | Pueblo | 2032 | TBD |

== See also ==
- Colorado Joint Line – the rail corridor between Pueblo and Denver
