= Boulder Community Health =

- Company type: Nonprofit organization
- Industry: Healthcare
- Founded: 1922; 103 years ago in Boulder, Colorado, United States
- Headquarters: 4747 Arapahoe Ave., Boulder, Colorado, United States
- Areas served: Boulder County and Broomfield, Colorado
- Key people: Robert Vissers (President & CEO)
- Website: www.bch.org

Boulder Community Health (BCH) is a nonprofit health system located in Boulder, Colorado.

== History ==
The origins of the health system began nearly two years after the University of Colorado School of Medicine decided to relocate their campus to Denver with the formation of the nonprofit Community Hospital Association on April 19, 1922.

=== Boulder Community Hospital ===
In 1926, the Boulder Community Hospital was dedicated with 45 beds at 1100 Balsam Avenue, north of downtown Boulder.

Beginning in 1955, Boulder Community Hospital raised funds to expand. By 1974, the hospital had a capacity of 172 beds and was seeing more than 14,000 emergency department patients annually.

On October 9, 2014, Boulder Community Health consolidated all of its emergency and trauma services and most inpatient including cancer, surgery, and orthopedic to Foothills Hospital in East Boulder. Services that remained at the Boulder Community Hospital location included non-critical care, in-patient rehab, behavior health care, and billing and records.

The city of Boulder agreed to purchase the Boulder Community Hospital campus in 2015. Boulder Community Health moved its final service from the location on April 8, 2019, and held a closing ceremony on April 26. The property was turned over to the city of Boulder in May.

=== Health system ===
By 1985, Boulder Community Hospital began to expanding to other locations outside Boulder Community Hospital through opening of new centers and acquisition of Boulder Memorial Hospital.

In 2003, Foothills Hospital was opened at a more central location to better serve its service area in response to the population growth in east Boulder County.

On April 22, 2014, Boulder Community Hospital announced that they were adopting the name Boulder Community Health for their regional health system to reflect its growth.

BCH is one of Colorado's few remaining independent health systems.

== Behavioral and mental health care ==
Boulder Community Health in 2021 created a new mental health care program called the Pathways Partial Hospitalization Program and the Pathways Intensive Outpatient Program, both of which use mindfulness-based techniques, coupled with nature-based care.

Additionally, the Boulder Community Health Foundation has established the Anchor Point Mental Health Endowment, a fund that supports the mental well-being of patients along the continuum of care.
