= Boulder station =

Former Boulder, Colorado train depot

Coordinates: 40.024923°N 105.250897°W

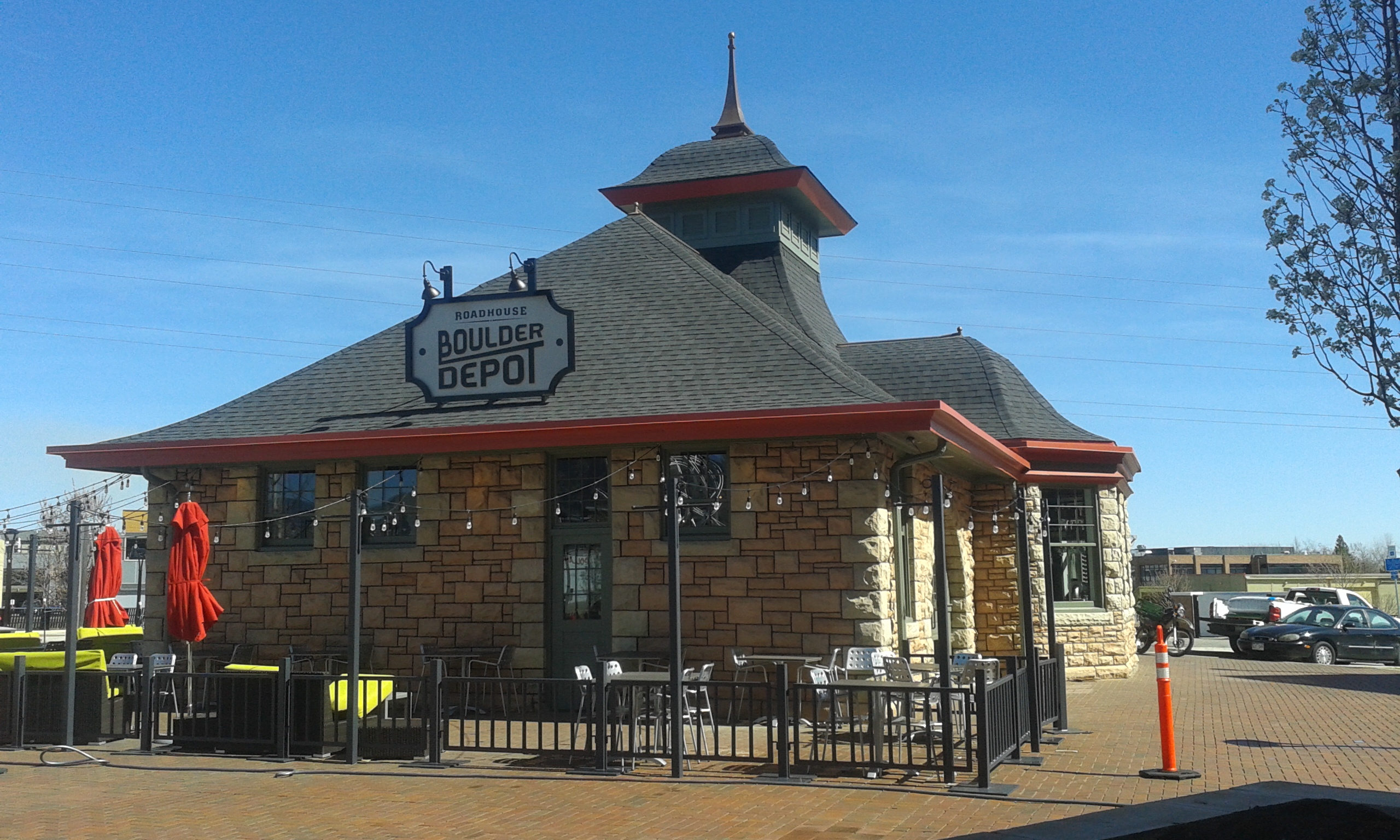
- Roadhouse Boulder Depot in April 2016

General information
- Location: 2366 Junction Pl; Boulder, Colorado 80301 (Note: Originally built on the intersection of 14th Street and Canyon Boulevard, later moved to the Whole Foods Market on 30th Street and Pearl Street in 1973, and then to its current location in 2008.); United States

History
- Opened: 1890
- Rebuilt: 1957

Former services (at original location)
Preceding station	Union Pacific Railroad	Following station
Terminus	Boulder – Denver	Valmont toward Denver
Future services
Preceding station	Amtrak	Following station
Longmont toward Fort Collins	Colorado Connector Opening 2029	Louisville toward Denver
Preceding station	RTD	Following station
Longmont Terminus	B Line Future extension	Louisville toward Union Station
Location

The Boulder station is a retired train depot in Boulder, Colorado. It was originally built in 1890 in downtown Boulder to serve as a depot for the Union Pacific Railroad. The depot was built in a modified Richardson Romanesque style from native Boulder County stone. The depot operated as a train station at its original location until 1957, when a new depot opened and replaced it.

The depot was purchased by a bus company and it functioned as a bus transit terminal until 1973, when the Boulder Jaycees' purchase saved it from demolition; it was moved it to a location near the original Boulder County, Colorado Fairgrounds. The efforts of the Boulder Jaycees and Historic Boulder, Inc. were instrumental in preserving the structure.

In October 2008, the City of Boulder and the Colorado Regional Transportation District moved the depot again, this time to the site of a new, transit-oriented development on the east side of 30th Street.

In December 2015, the depot reopened as a restaurant and bar named Roadhouse Boulder Depot, part of the Boulder Junction at Depot Square development.

== Future transit services ==
Boulder Junction is currently proposed as a station on the RTD B Line extension and Amtrak's Colorado Connector.
