= Hanna Kroeger =

American health food and alternative medicine pioneer (1913–1998)

- Born: October 5, 1913; Attabey, Turkey
- Died: May 7, 1998 (aged 84); Boulder
- Education: German nursing school
- Spouse: Rudolph Kroeger

Hanna Ursula Kroeger, née Zimmer (October 5, 1913 – May 7, 1998) was a vendor of health food and alternative medicine products in the United States. She operated a variety of businesses in Boulder, Colorado — including a health food store, restaurant, and wholesale herb business — from 1957 until her death 41 years later.

== Early life and family ==
Hanna Ursula Zimmer was born October 5, 1913, in Attabey, Turkey, to German missionaries who ran an orphanage. Her father, Max, communicated with Alice Bailey, an esoteric wisdom teacher; her mother, Hannah, was a herbal medicine practitioner. Kroeger was the youngest of six children. She grew up watching her parents help the less fortunate.

Hanna Zimmer married Rudolph Kroeger, a mechanical engineer. They had five children: sons Klaus, Heinz and Albrecht; daughters Gisela and Anneliese. Rudolph was imprisoned for five years in a Russian labor camp after WWII. After his release he wanted to take his family as far from Russia as he could. They tried for years to immigrate to the U.S. and finally found sponsors, allowing them to immigrate in 1953. They traveled for 3 years before settling in Boulder in 1956.

== Education ==
Hanna studied nursing at her parents’ mission hospital in Turkey. She later graduated from a German nursing school and became an RN. She then worked at a Dresden hospital where she learned natural healing techniques.

== Career ==
Approximately a year after her arrival in Boulder Kroeger took over a tea and coffee company from the owner who was retiring. She added healing teas, baked goods, seeds, nuts, raisins, oils and other items to the store’s offerings and renamed it Imperial Tea and Health Foods. A few years later she purchased a building at 1122 Pearl, renamed the store “New Age Foods,” and added vitamins. Later a vegetarian restaurant was added upstairs.

In addition to selling vitamins and health food Kroeger offered health advice. She sometimes used a method called “dowsing’ whereby she would suspend a pendulum and observe its motions to diagnose illness.

Kroeger also started the Kroeger Herb Wholesale Product Company (still operating as Kroeger Herb Products Co., Inc.) that sold hundreds of lines of herbs and homeopathic treatments carried in stores all over the world. She developed over 200 homeopathic remedies. She was the author of over 20 books, mostly dealing with herbal therapies that she largely obtained from traditional European and Native American teachings.

In 1967 Kroeger and her family started a health resort, Peaceful Meadow. The resort followed the model of popular European health resorts.

Her family also started the Chapel of Miracles on their property. Later in her life Kroeger ministered each Sunday to approximately 100 congregants.

== Legal proceedings ==
On April 16, 1971, Kroeger was indicted on 11 counts of practicing medicine without a license. District Attorney Stanley Johnson claimed she received compensation for treating patients without the required qualifications. The trial began November 15, 1971. Undercover Pinkerton agents hired by the State Board of Medical Examiners testified that Kroeger had provided advice to them about various fabricated ailments. She was found guilty of 5 charges but granted a new trial because her defense attorneys were denied access to grand jury testimony. The case was dismissed in May 1972 after she agreed to stop giving medical advice.

Kroeger felt the DA targeted her because she was an immigrant and because she had many hippie customers. Protesters gathered outside the trial with signs stating, “Natural Healing is Not Quackery,” “Suggesting Good Food is Not Practicing Medicine,” “Herbs and Vitamins are Not Drugs,” among others.

In February 1989 the State Board of Medical Examiners filed a complaint asking the Boulder District Court to prohibit Kroeger from practicing medicine. She agreed to give up her practice to avoid a trial. She continued to offer advice by phone and at her chapel.

== Death ==
Kroeger died on May 7, 1998, in Boulder. Following her death her daughter Gisela left a career as a mathematics professor and database designer to take over Kroeger’s business.
