= Dushanbe Tea House =

Building in Colorado, United States

Coordinates: 40.015403°N 105.277342°W

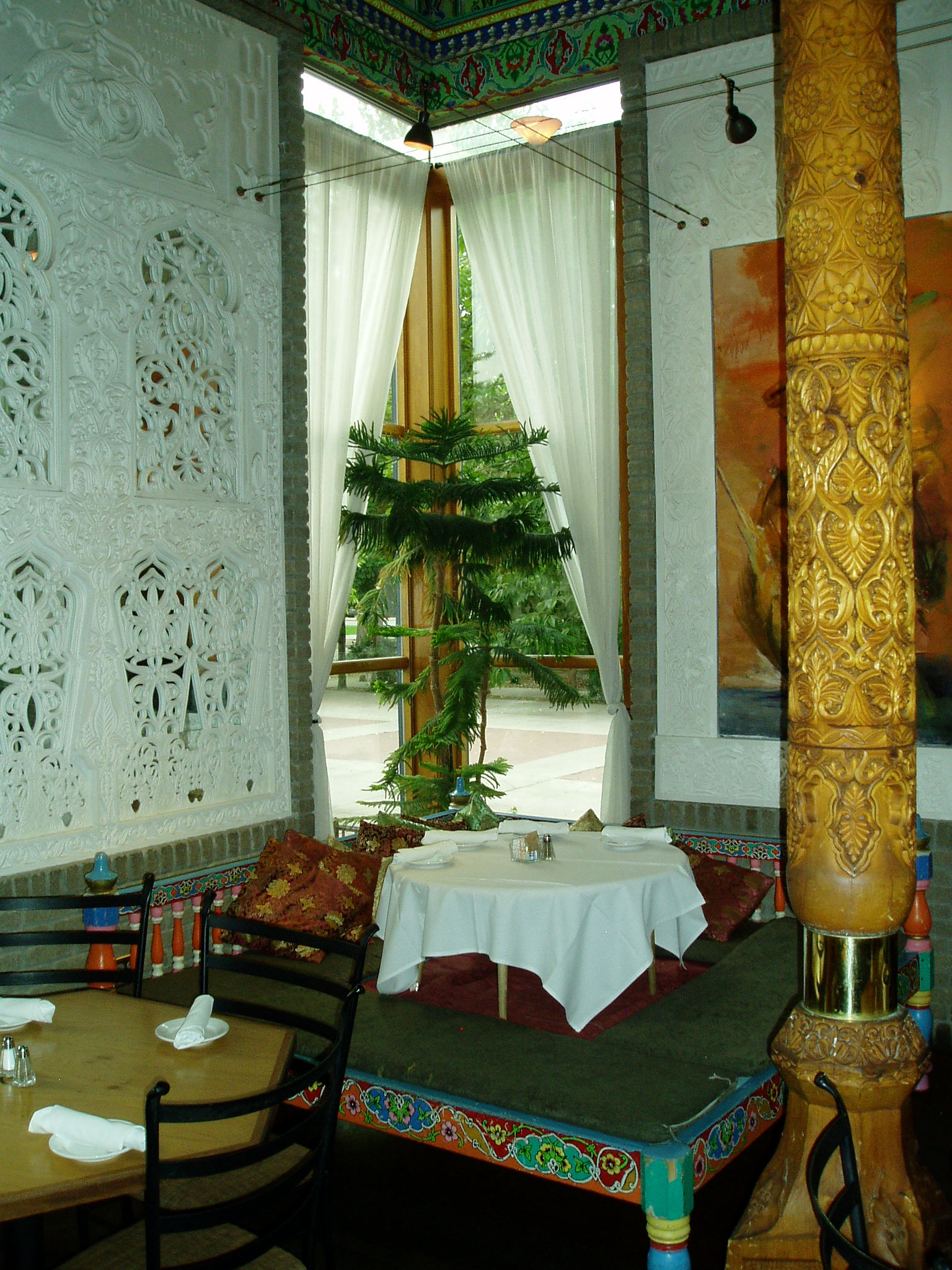
A low table with cushions instead of chairs for seating. Note the ornate decorations of the wooden column, the wall, and the edge of the table.

The Boulder Dushanbe Tea House was a gift from Mayor Maksud Ikramov of Dushanbe to the city of Boulder, Colorado.

== History ==
The Boulder Dushanbe Teahouse was created as a gift to the city of Boulder, Colorado, from its sister city Dushanbe, the capital of the Tajik Soviet Socialist Republic, then part of the Soviet Union and now Tajikistan, in 1987. Forty Tajik artisans hand-made the teahouse over a period of two years, took it apart, and then packed the pieces into about 200 crates to be shipped to Boulder. The trades used by the artisans were passed from generation to generation within families, such as the use of nature, and repetition of patterns, descendant from traditional Persian design. Also, no power tools were used in the original construction of the tea house.

Lack of funds meant that it took several years to erect the teahouse. Many dedicated individuals including former Boulder mayor Linda Jourgensen, longtime city council member Sally Martin, Boulder-Dushanbe Sister Cities members Mary Axe, Jancy Campbell, noted local architect Vern Seieroe and many others kept the project alive by continuously promoting the unique gift in the community year in and year out.

Boulder-Dushanbe Sister Cities fostered the project until members helped form the Boulder-Dushanbe Teahouse Trust with other community leaders. After nearly a decade during which the teahouse remained unassembled in storage crates, many members of the community supported erecting the teahouse by donating thousands of dollars in private donations, but that was not enough. Finally, the Teahouse Trust was able to negotiate an arrangement with the City of Boulder that allowed lease revenues generated by a restaurant operator to pay for a substantial portion of the million-plus dollar funds needed to erect the structure in accordance with Boulder building codes. This arrangement was in keeping with city government sentiment that taxpayer funds should not be used for the endeavor. The teahouse was erected on city property and opened to the public in 1998.

== Decoration ==
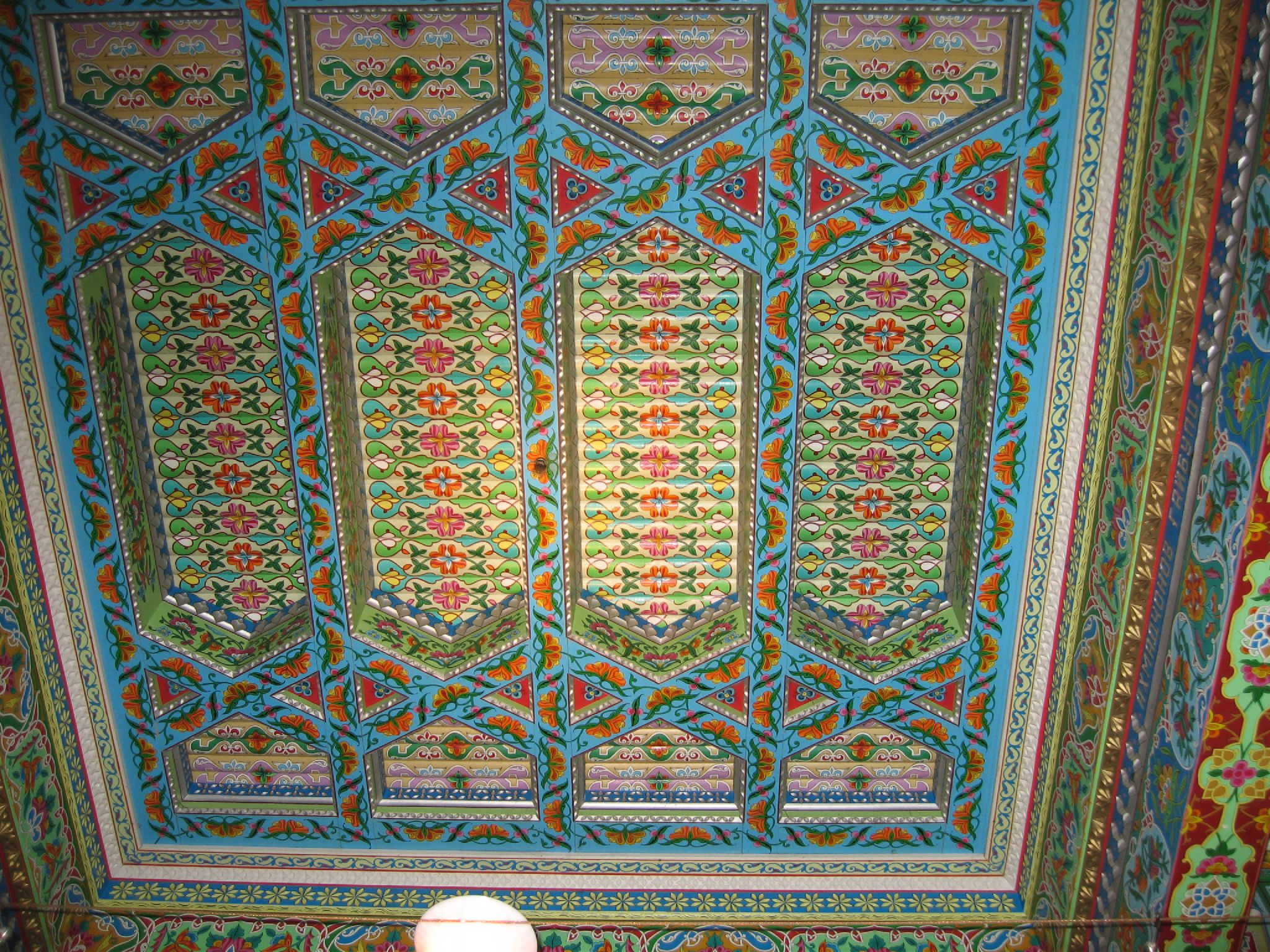
Detail from the ceiling of the teahouse

It is situated along a brook that shoots off Boulder Creek in keeping with the tradition that teahouses be placed along waterways or other bodies of water. Reflecting another traditional aspect of Tajik culture, the Boulder Valley Rose Society donated and planted an elaborate rose garden on the teahouse grounds. Inside the teahouse there are uniquely designed hand-carved cedar pillars, handmade traditional Tajikistan furniture, a fountain with seven bronze statues of women based on a 12th-century poem "The Seven Beauties", original oil paintings done onsite by a Tajik artist, and traditional geometric plaster carvings. The outside decorative elements include eight ceramic tiles, which display the patterns of a "Tree of life".

The current operator is Lenny Martinelli. The building and grounds are property of the City of Boulder.
