= Boulder, Colorado =

Home rule city and seat of Boulder County, Colorado, United States

Boulder
- Home rule municipality
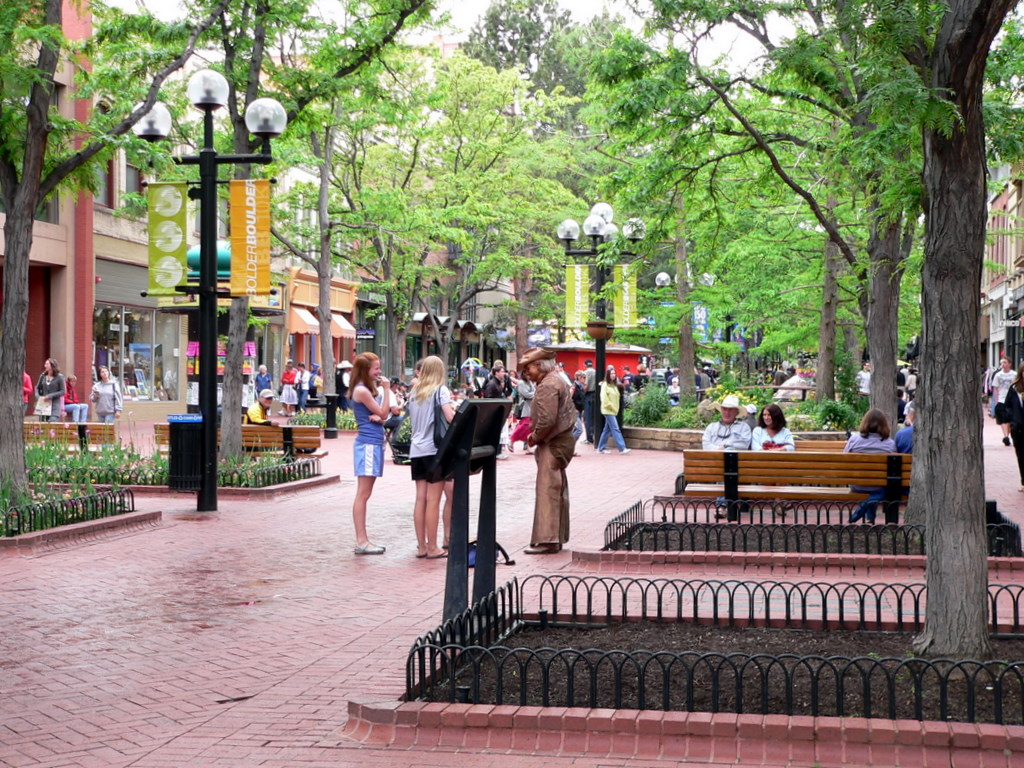
- Pearl Street Mall in downtown Boulder, 2009

- Seal
- Interactive map of Boulder
- Location within Colorado Location within the United States
- Coordinates: 39°59′36″N 105°14′42″W
- Country: United States
- State: Colorado
- County: Boulder
- Settled: 1858 as Boulder City, N.T.
- Incorporated: November 4, 1871

Government
  - Type: Home rule city
  - Mayor: Aaron Brockett (D)
  - Mayor Pro Tem: Tara Winer

Area
  - Home rule municipality: 27.366 sq mi (70.877 km^{2})
  - Land: 26.328 sq mi (68.188 km^{2})
  - Water: 1.038 sq mi (2.689 km^{2})
- Elevation: 5,269 ft (1,606 m)

Population (2020)
  - Home rule municipality: 108,250
  - Estimate (2024): 106,803 ▼
  - Rank: 12th in Colorado; 324th in United States
  - Density: 4,112/sq mi (1,588/km^{2})
  - Metro: 330,758 (155th)
  - CSA: 3,623,560 (17th)
  - Front Range: 5,055,344
- Demonym: Boulderite

GDP
  - Metro: $35.608 billion (2022)
- Time zone: UTC−07:00 (MST)
  - Summer (DST): UTC−06:00 (MDT)
- ZIP Codes: 80301-80310, 80314, 80321-80323, 80328, 80329
- Area codes: 303/720/983
- GNIS city ID: 2409883
- FIPS code: 08-07850
- Website: bouldercolorado.gov

Boulder is a home rule city that is the county seat of, and the most populous municipality in, Boulder County, Colorado, United States. With a population of 108,250 at the 2020 census, it is the 12th-most populous city in Colorado. Boulder is the primary city of the Boulder metropolitan area, which had 330,758 residents in 2020, and is part of the Front Range Urban Corridor.

Boulder is located at the base of the foothills of the Rocky Mountains, at an elevation of 5,430 feet (1,655 m) above sea level. The city is 25 miles (40 km) northwest of the Colorado state capital of Denver. Boulder is a college town, hosting the University of Colorado Boulder, the flagship and largest campus of the University of Colorado system, as well as numerous research institutes. Starting in 2027, Boulder will become the new home of the Sundance Film Festival.

== History ==
Archaeological evidence shows that Boulder Valley has been continuously inhabited by Native American tribes for over 13,000 years, beginning in the late Pleistocene era. Between 9500 BC and 1550 AD, indigenous peoples moved seasonally between the mountains and plains, taking shelter in winter along the Front Range trough where Boulder now lies. By the 1500s, the Ute people held primary occupation of Boulder Valley. In the early 1800s, the Arapaho migrated to the region. Additional Native American nations with historical ties to the broader Front Range include the Apache, Arapaho, Cheyenne, Comanche, Kiowa, Pawnee, Shoshone, Sioux, and Ute peoples. In the 1800s, European Americans settled in the area.

Boulder was founded in late 1858 when prospectors led by Thomas Aikins arrived at Boulder Canyon during the Colorado Gold Rush. According to historical accounts, they initially camped in an area historically associated with Arapaho leader Chief Niwot, though the Arapaho's stable settlement had been displaced by earlier treaty obligations. Under the Treaty of Fort Wise (1861), the Arapaho were formally forced to relocate to the Cheyenne-Arapaho Reservation. Some of these early settlers later participated in the 1864 Sand Creek massacre, where Niwot himself was killed. In early 1859, gold was discovered along Boulder Creek, drawing more miners and merchants to the area. The Boulder City Town Company was formed in February 1859 to establish a settlement at the canyon mouth. The Boulder, Nebraska Territory, post office opened on April 22, 1859.

On August 24, 1859, voters of the Pike's Peak mining region approved the formation of the Provisional Government of the Territory of Jefferson, and on November 28, 1859, the extralegal Jefferson Territory created Jackson County with Boulder City as its seat. By 1860, Boulder City had 70 cabins, occupied mainly by Anglo families. Chinese miners and Black residents lived in early Boulder but experienced systematic marginalization and were largely absent from contemporary photographs and official records, reflecting the racial hierarchies of the era.

The free Territory of Colorado was organized on February 28, 1861, and Boulder County was created on November 1, 1861, with Boulder City as its seat. The Arapaho were forced to relocate by the Treaty of Fort Wise. With declining numbers, Niwot's band soon moved to the Cheyenne-Arapaho Reservation. By 1862, the creek had yielded $100,000 in gold, and Boulder's population exceeded 300.

On November 7, 1861, the Colorado General Assembly passed legislation to locate the University of Colorado in Boulder. The City of Boulder City was incorporated on November 4, 1871. On September 20, 1875, the first cornerstone was laid for the first building (Old Main) on the CU campus. Colorado became a state on August 1, 1876, and the university officially opened on September 5, 1877. The City of Boulder City shortened its name to the City of Boulder.

In 1907, Boulder adopted an anti-saloon ordinance. In 1916, statewide prohibition started in Colorado, and ended with the repeal of national prohibition in 1933.

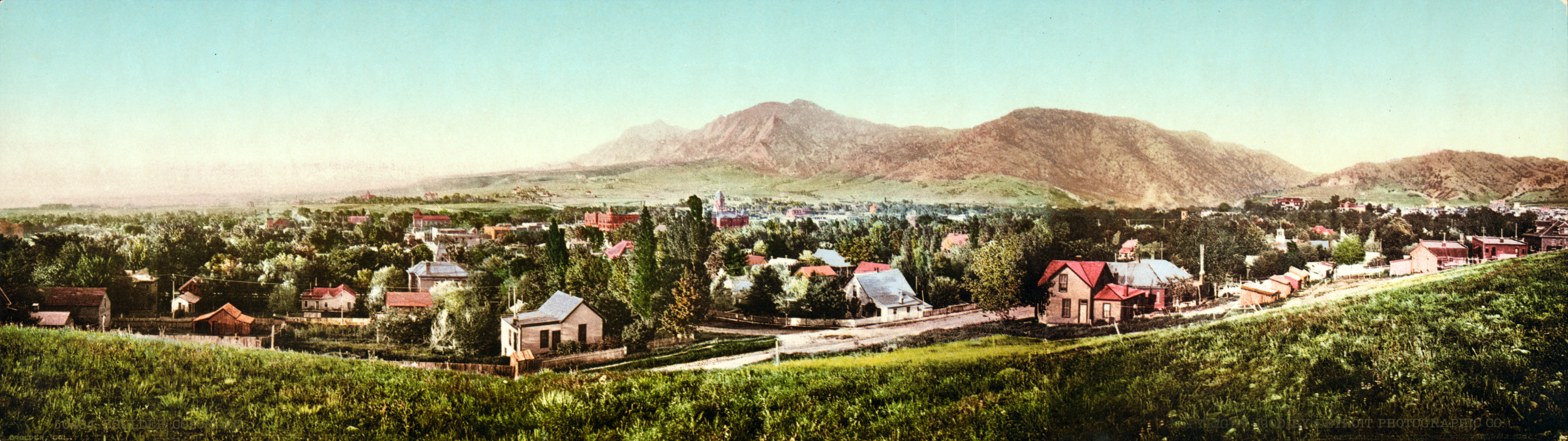
Boulder in 1900

=== Housing ===
Median home prices rose 60% from 2010 to 2015 to $648,200. In 2024, the City Council of Boulder repealed a long-standing law that prevented Boulder from increasing new residential units by more than 1% in a year.

In 1959, city voters approved the "Blue Line" city-charter amendment, which restricted city water service to altitudes below 5,750 feet (1,750 m), to protect the mountain backdrop from development. In 1967, city voters approved a dedicated sales tax to acquire open space to contain urban sprawl. In 1970, Boulder created a "comprehensive plan" to dictate future zoning, transportation, and urban planning decisions. In 1972, the city enacted a height-limiting ordinance for buildings to preserve views of the Flatirons and surrounding mountains. This ordinance remains in effect and continues to shape Boulder's skyline and downtown development patterns. In 1974, a Historic Preservation Code was passed. In 1976, a residential-growth management ordinance, the Danish Plan, was passed.

== Geography ==
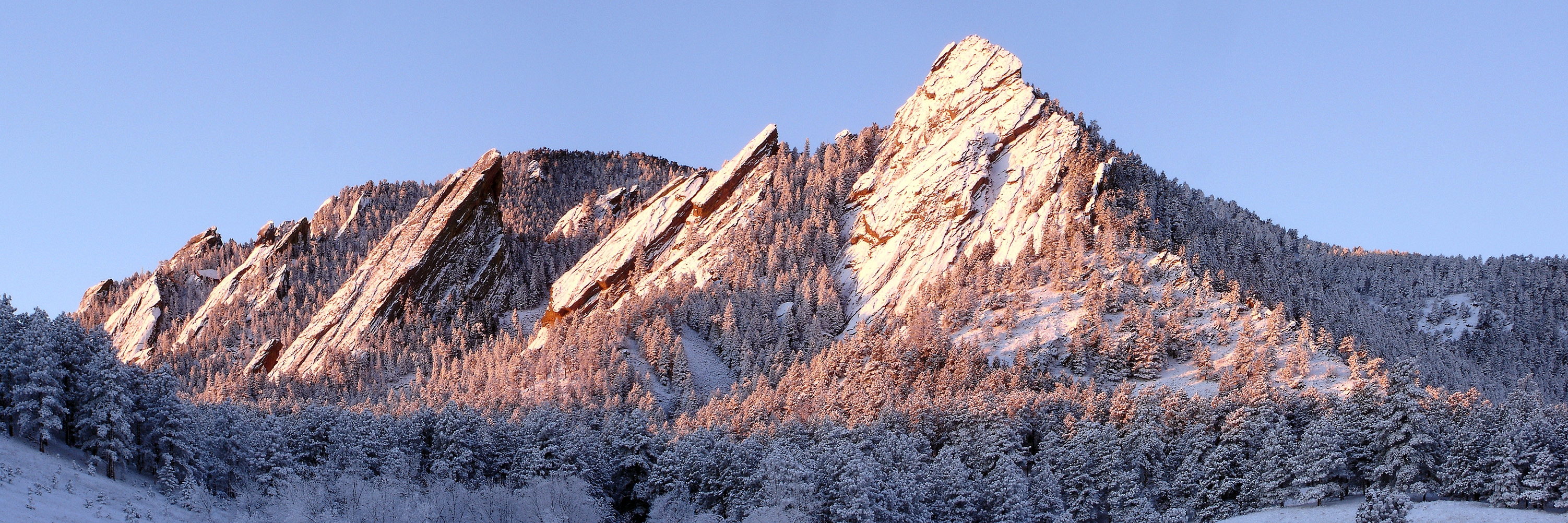
Boulder's rock formations, the Flatirons

The city of Boulder is located in the Boulder Valley, where the Rocky Mountains meet the Great Plains. The Flatirons, slabs of sedimentary stone tilted up on the foothills, are located west of the city and are a widely recognized symbol of Boulder.

Boulder Creek is the primary flow of water through Boulder. The creek was named before the city's founding and its etymology is unknown. It is from Boulder Creek that the city is believed to have taken its name. Boulder Creek has significant water flow, derived primarily from snow melt and minor springs west of the city. The creek flows into St. Vrain Creek east of Longmont, which is a tributary of the South Platte River.

At the 2020 United States census, the city had a total area of 17,514 acres (70.877 km^{2}), including 664 acres (2.689 km^{2}) of water.

The 40th parallel, 40 degrees north latitude, runs through Boulder and can be easily recognized as Baseline Road today.

Boulder lies in a wide basin beneath Flagstaff Mountain just a few miles east of the continental divide and about 25 miles (40 km) northwest of Denver. Arapahoe Glacier provides water for the city, along with Boulder Creek, which flows through the center of the city.

Denver International Airport is located 33 miles (53 km) east-southeast of Boulder.

=== Environment ===
In 1899, government preservation of open space around Boulder began, with the Congress of the United States approving the allocation of 1,800 acres (7.3 km^{2}) of mountain backdrop and watershed extending from South Boulder Creek to Sunshine Canyon.

==== Wildlife protection ====
Boulder has created an Urban Wildlife Management Plan which sets policies for managing and protecting urban wildlife. The city's Parks and Recreation and Open Space and Mountain Parks departments have volunteers who monitor parks, including wetlands, lakes, etc., to protect ecosystems. From time to time, parks and hiking trails are closed to conserve or restore ecosystems. Traditionally, Boulder has avoided using chemical pesticides to control the insect population. However, with the threat of West Nile virus, the city began an integrative plan to control the mosquito population in 2003 that includes chemical pesticides. Residents can opt out of the program by contacting the city and asking that their areas not be sprayed.

Under Boulder law, exterminating prairie dogs requires a permit.

In 2005, the city experimented with using goats for weed control in environmentally sensitive areas. Goats naturally consume diffuse knapweed and Canada thistle, and although the program was less effective than expected, goats will still be considered in future weed control projects. In 2010, goats were used to keep weeds under control at the Boulder Reservoir.

The city's Open Space and Mountain Parks department manages approximately 8,000 acres (32 km^{2}) of protected forest land west of the city, in accordance with a 1999 Forest Ecosystem Management Plan. The plan aims to maintain or enhance native plant and animal species, their communities, the ecological processes that sustain them and to reduce the wildfire risk to forest and human communities.

=== Climate ===
Boulder, Colorado

Climate chart (precipitation, max. and min. temperature)
J	F	M	A	M	J	J	A	S	O	N	D
0.8 47 22	1 48 22	2 57 29	3.1 63 35	3.2 71 43	2 83 51	1.8 88 57	1.7 86 56	2.1 79 48	1.6 66 37	1.2 55 28	0.8 46 21
- █ Average max. and min. temperatures in °F
- █ Precipitation totals in inches
- Source: NOAA
Metric conversion
J	F	M	A	M	J	J	A	S	O	N	D
21 8 −6	25 9 −5	51 14 −2	77 17 1	82 22 6	50 28 11	46 31 14	43 30 13	53 26 9	41 19 3	30 13 −2	21 8 −6
- █ Average max. and min. temperatures in °C
- █ Precipitation totals in mm

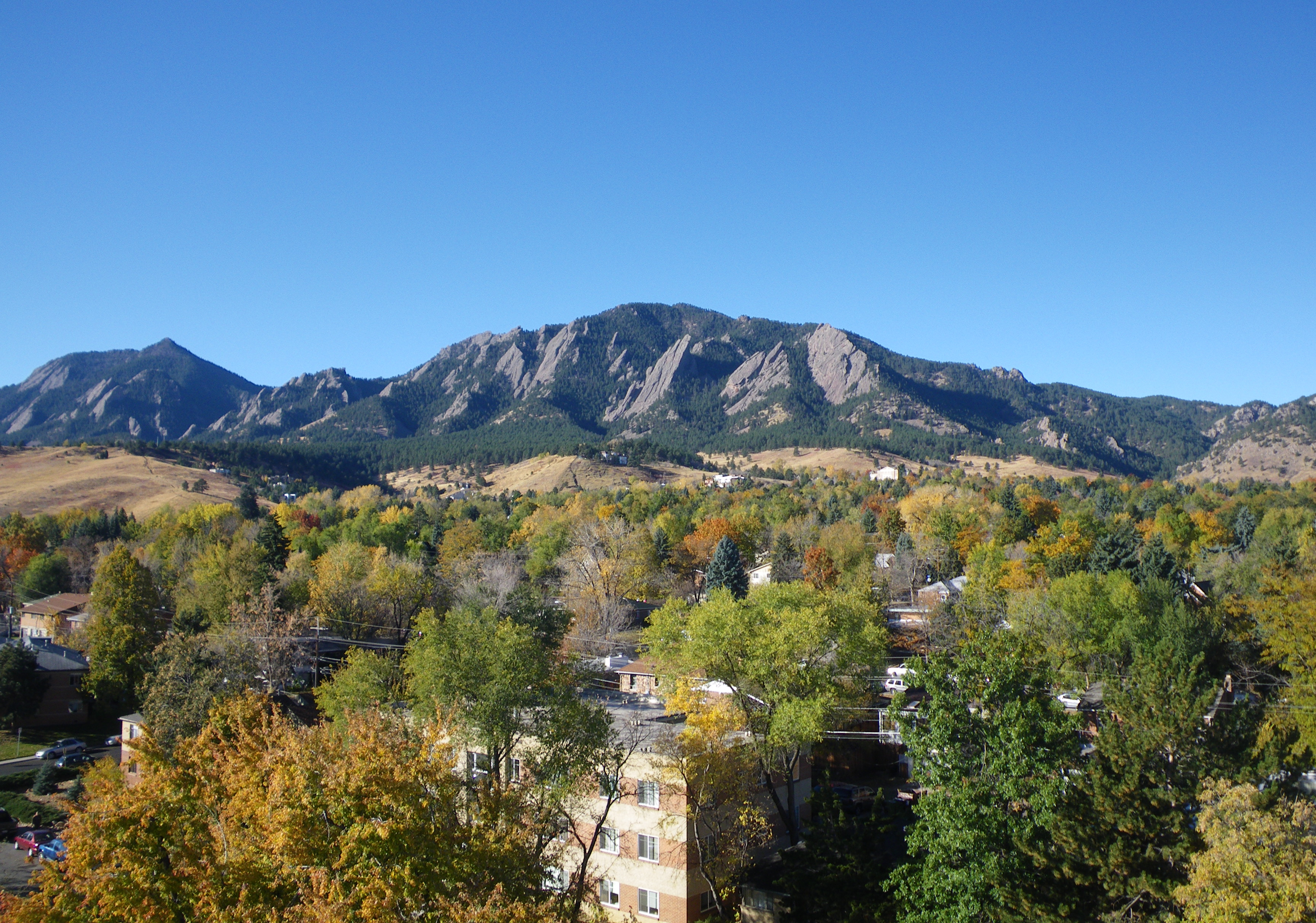
Autumn in Boulder

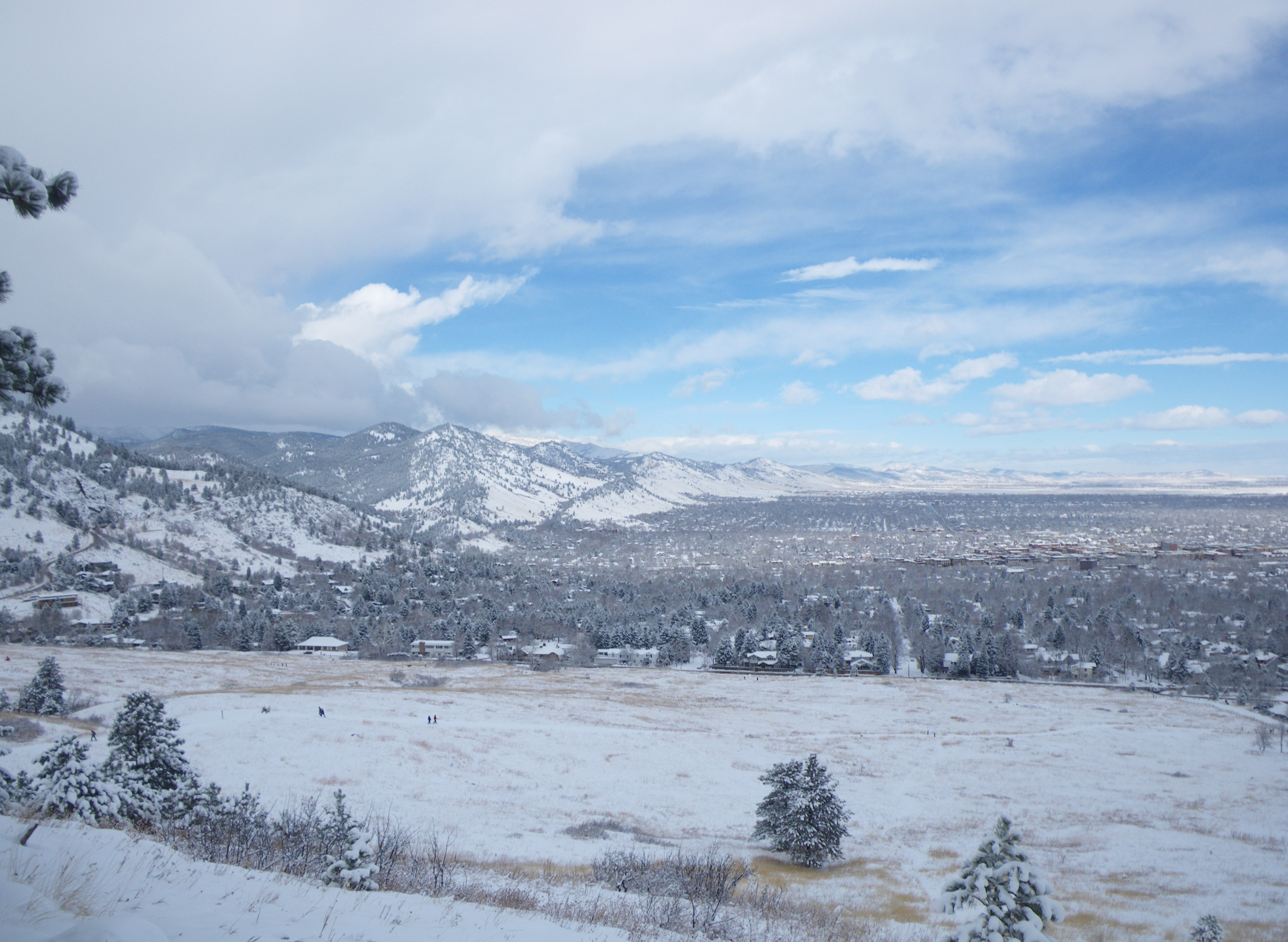
Snowfall is common in Boulder throughout the winter.

Boulder has a temperate climate typical for much of the state and receives many sunny or mostly sunny days each year. Boulder is considered semi-arid (Köppen: BSk) or humid subtropical (Köppen: Cfa) within the Köppen climate classification due to its relatively high yearly precipitation and average temperatures remaining above 32 °F (0 °C) year-round.

Winter conditions range from generally mild to the occasional bitterly cold. Highs average in the mid to upper 40s °F (7–9 °C). There are 4.6 nights annually when the temperature drops to 0 °F (−18 °C). Because of orographic lift, the mountains to the west often dry out the air passing over the Front Range, shielding the city from precipitation in winter, though heavy snowfalls may occur. Snowfall averages 88 inches (220 cm) per season. Snow depth is usually shallow. Due to the high elevation, a strong warming sun can quickly melt snow cover during the day and Chinook winds bring rapid warm-ups throughout the winter months.

Summers are warm, with frequent afternoon thunderstorms. There are roughly 30 days of 90 °F (32 °C) or above each year. Diurnal temperature variation is typically large due to the high elevation and semi-arid climate. Daytime highs are generally cooler than those of most Colorado cities with similar elevations.

The highest recorded temperature of 104 °F (40 °C) was on June 23, 1954, July 11, 1954, and August 3, 2026. The record low was −33 °F (−36 °C) on January 17, 1930. The coldest high temperature, −12 °F (−24 °C), was on February 4, 1989. The warmest overnight low was on June 24, 1954, with a temperature of 80 °F (27 °C).

Climate data for Boulder, Colorado, 1991–2020 normals, extremes 1893–present
Month	Jan	Feb	Mar	Apr	May	Jun	Jul	Aug	Sep	Oct	Nov	Dec	Year
Record high °F (°C)	73 (23)	79 (26)	90 (32)	88 (31)	95 (35)	104 (40)	104 (40)	104 (40)	100 (38)	90 (32)	81 (27)	76 (24)	104 (40)
Mean maximum °F (°C)	65.4 (18.6)	66.4 (19.1)	73.9 (23.3)	79.5 (26.4)	86.6 (30.3)	94.2 (34.6)	97.9 (36.6)	95.3 (35.2)	91.5 (33.1)	83.1 (28.4)	72.8 (22.7)	65.4 (18.6)	98.5 (36.9)
Mean daily maximum °F (°C)	47.0 (8.3)	48.3 (9.1)	57.0 (13.9)	62.8 (17.1)	71.3 (21.8)	82.5 (28.1)	88.0 (31.1)	86.0 (30.0)	78.8 (26.0)	65.9 (18.8)	54.5 (12.5)	46.3 (7.9)	65.7 (18.7)
Daily mean °F (°C)	34.3 (1.3)	35.3 (1.8)	43.0 (6.1)	48.7 (9.3)	57.0 (13.9)	66.8 (19.3)	72.5 (22.5)	70.7 (21.5)	63.5 (17.5)	51.6 (10.9)	41.3 (5.2)	33.7 (0.9)	51.5 (10.9)
Mean daily minimum °F (°C)	21.5 (−5.8)	22.3 (−5.4)	29.0 (−1.7)	34.5 (1.4)	42.7 (5.9)	51.1 (10.6)	57.0 (13.9)	55.5 (13.1)	48.1 (8.9)	37.2 (2.9)	28.1 (−2.2)	21.1 (−6.1)	37.3 (2.9)
Mean minimum °F (°C)	−0.5 (−18.1)	0.9 (−17.3)	10.7 (−11.8)	19.4 (−7.0)	30.1 (−1.1)	41.3 (5.2)	50.0 (10.0)	47.4 (8.6)	34.7 (1.5)	20.1 (−6.6)	7.9 (−13.4)	0.4 (−17.6)	−7.5 (−21.9)
Record low °F (°C)	−33 (−36)	−28 (−33)	−13 (−25)	−3 (−19)	17 (−8)	20 (−7)	40 (4)	40 (4)	15 (−9)	−2 (−19)	−12 (−24)	−24 (−31)	−33 (−36)
Average precipitation inches (mm)	0.83 (21)	0.99 (25)	1.99 (51)	3.05 (77)	3.21 (82)	1.95 (50)	1.83 (46)	1.68 (43)	2.09 (53)	1.62 (41)	1.18 (30)	0.81 (21)	21.23 (540)
Average snowfall inches (cm)	11.3 (29)	15.0 (38)	15.7 (40)	14.7 (37)	2.0 (5.1)	0.0 (0.0)	0.0 (0.0)	0.0 (0.0)	1.0 (2.5)	7.0 (18)	13.1 (33)	13.0 (33)	92.8 (235.6)
Average extreme snow depth inches (cm)	5.9 (15)	6.6 (17)	6.5 (17)	4.6 (12)	0.8 (2.0)	0.0 (0.0)	0.0 (0.0)	0.0 (0.0)	0.3 (0.76)	3.9 (9.9)	7.0 (18)	6.9 (18)	12.9 (33)
Average precipitation days (≥ 0.01 in)	5.8	6.9	8.1	10.1	12.6	10.1	10.6	10.5	7.9	7.1	5.9	5.4	101.0
Average snowy days (≥ 0.1 in)	5.6	6.5	6.0	4.9	0.9	0.0	0.0	0.0	0.5	2.1	4.8	5.5	36.8
Mean daily daylight hours	9.7	10.7	12.0	13.3	14.4	15.0	14.7	13.7	12.4	11.1	10.0	9.4	12.2
Average ultraviolet index	2	3	5	7	9	11	11	10	7	5	3	2	6
Source 1: NOAA
Source 2: Weather Atlas (daylight)

== Demographics ==
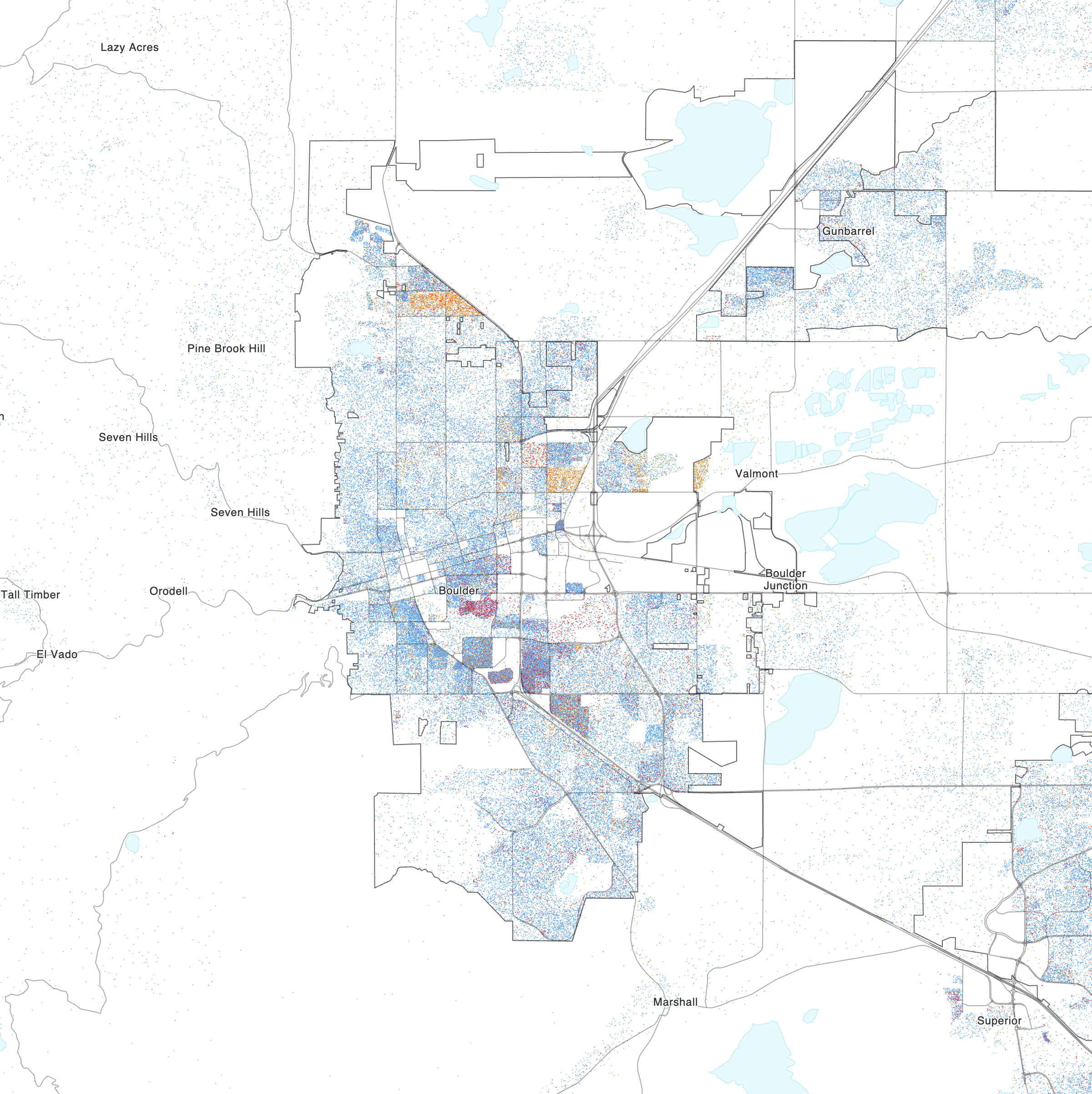
A map of racial distribution in Boulder, 2020 US census. Each dot is one person: ⬤ White ⬤ Black ⬤ Asian ⬤ Hispanic ⬤ Multiracial ⬤ Native American/other

Boulder is the principal city of the Boulder, CO Metropolitan Statistical Area.

=== 2020 census ===
Historical population
Census	Pop.	Note	%±
1870	343		—
1880	3,069		794.8%
1890	3,330		8.5%
1900	6,150		84.7%
1910	9,539		55.1%
1920	11,006		15.4%
1930	11,223		2.0%
1940	12,958		15.5%
1950	19,999		54.3%
1960	37,718		88.6%
1970	66,870		77.3%
1980	76,685		14.7%
1990	83,312		8.6%
2000	94,673		13.6%
2010	97,385		2.9%
2020	108,250		11.2%
2024 (est.)	106,803	▼	−1.3%
U.S. Decennial Census

Boulder, Colorado – Racial and ethnic composition Note: the US Census treats Hispanic/Latino as an ethnic category. This table excludes Latinos from the racial categories and assigns them to a separate category. Hispanics/Latinos may be of any race.
Race / ethnicity (NH = Non-Hispanic)	Pop. 2000	Pop. 2010	Pop. 2020	% 2000	% 2010	% 2020
White alone (NH)	79,721	80,873	82,700	84.21%	83.04%	76.40%
Black or African American alone (NH)	1,085	828	1,305	1.15%	0.85%	1.21%
Native American or Alaska Native alone (NH)	363	297	394	0.38%	0.30%	0.36%
Asian alone (NH)	3,772	4,558	6,934	3.98%	4.68%	6.41%
Native Hawaiian or Pacific Islander alone (NH)	46	60	122	0.05%	0.06%	0.11%
Other race alone (NH)	206	198	582	0.22%	0.20%	0.54%
Mixed race or Multiracial (NH)	1,679	2,064	4,773	1.77%	2.12%	4.41%
Hispanic or Latino (any race)	7,801	8,507	11,440	8.24%	8.74%	10.57%
Total	94,673	97,385	108,250	100.00%	100.00%	100.00%

In the 2010 census, there were 97,385 people, 41,302 households, and 16,694 families in the city. The population density was 3,942.7 inhabitants per square mile (1,522.3/km^{2}). There were 43,479 housing units at an average density of 1,760.3 units per square mile (679.7 units/km^{2}). The racial makeup of the city was 88.0% White, 0.9% Black or African American, 0.4% Native American, 4.7% Asian, 0.1% Pacific Islander, 3.2% some other race, and 2.6% from two or more races. 8.7% of the population were Hispanic or Latino of any race.

There were 41,302 households, of which 19.1% had children under 18 living with them, 32.2% were headed by married couples living together, 5.5% had a female householder with no husband present, and 59.6% were non-families. 35.8% of all households comprised individuals, and 7.1% were someone living alone who was 65 or older. The average household size was 2.16, and the average family size was 2.84.

Boulder's population is younger than the national average, largely due to the presence of university students. The median age at the 2010 census was 28.7 years compared to the U.S. median of 37.2 years. In Boulder, 13.9% of the residents were younger than 18, 29.1% from 18 to 24, 27.6% from 25 to 44, 20.3% from 45 to 64, and 8.9% were 65 or older. For every 100 females, there were 105.5 males. For every 100 females age 18 and older, there were 106.2 males.

In 2011, the estimated median household income in Boulder was $57,112, and the median family income was $113,681. Male full-time workers had a median income of $71,993 versus $47,574 for females. The per capita income for the city was $37,600. 24.8% of the population and 7.6% of families were below the poverty line. Out of the total population, 17.4% of those under 18 and 6.0% of those 65 and older were living below the poverty line.

== Economy ==
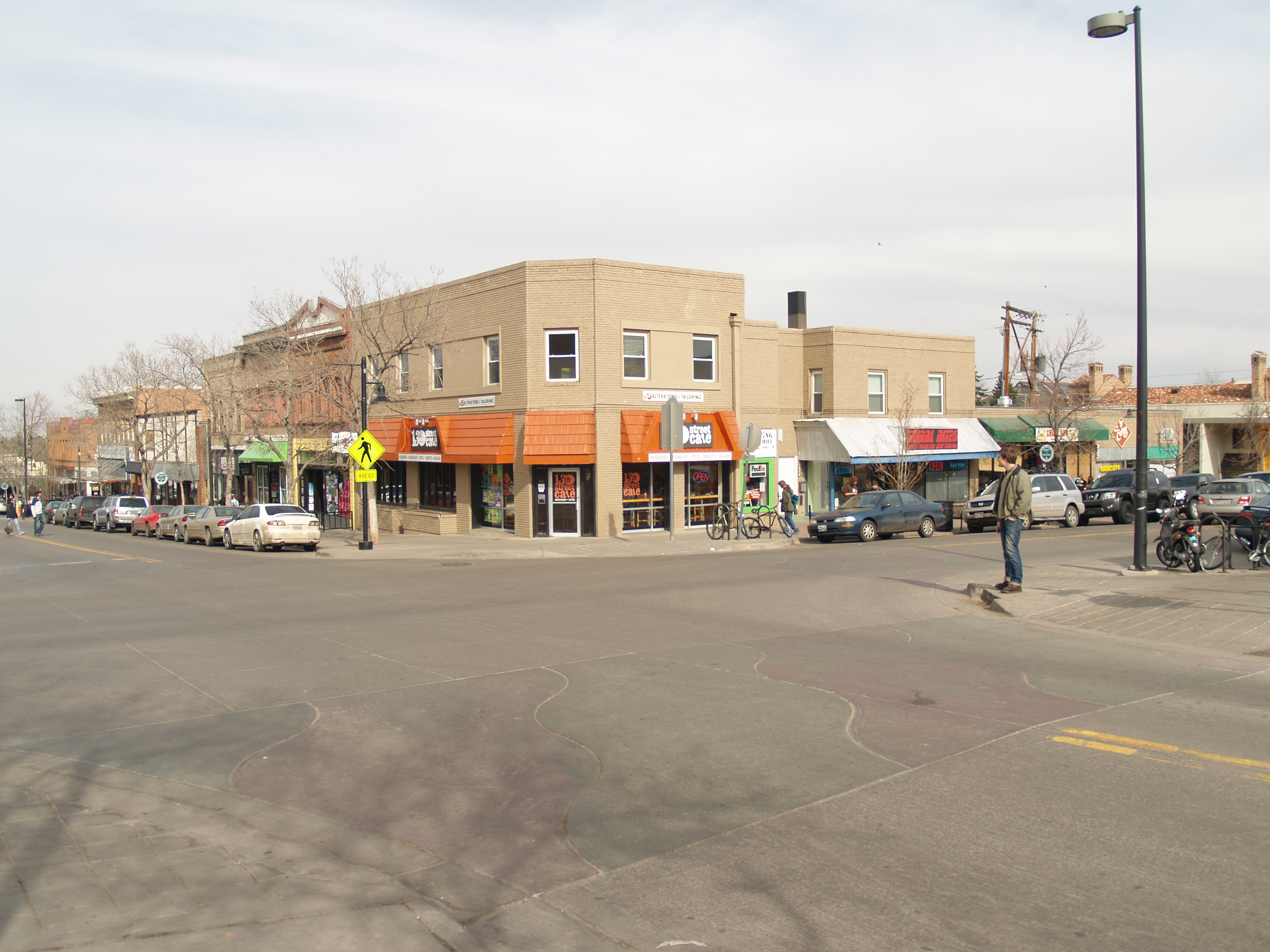
"The Hill" is one of the centers of off-campus life for students at the University of Colorado.

In 2010, the Boulder MSA had a gross metropolitan product of $18.3 billion, the 110th largest metropolitan economy in the United States.

In 2007, Boulder became the first city in the United States to levy a carbon tax.

In 2013, Boulder appeared on Forbes magazine's list of Best Places for Business and Careers.

=== Top employers ===
In the city's 2022 Annual Comprehensive Financial Report, the top employers are:

#	Employer	# of employees
1	University of Colorado Boulder	6,200
2	Ball Corporation	4,800
3	Boulder Valley School District	3,832
4	St. Vrain Valley School District	3,570
5	Boulder Community Health	2,360
6	Boulder County	2,040
7	City of Boulder	1,461
8	National Center for Atmospheric Research	1,187
9	University Corporation for Atmospheric Research	1,187
10	National Oceanic and Atmospheric Administration	870

== Arts and culture ==
=== Bolder Boulder ===
Boulder has hosted a 10 km road run, the Bolder Boulder, on Memorial Day every year since 1979. The race involves over 50,000 runners, joggers, walkers, and wheelchair racers, making it one of the largest road races in the world. It has the largest non-marathon prize purse in road racing. The race culminates at Folsom Field with a Memorial Day Tribute. The 2007 race featured over 54,000 runners, walkers, and wheelchair racers, making it the largest race in the US in which all participants are timed and the fifth largest road race in the world.

=== Music ===
Founded in 1958, the Boulder Philharmonic Orchestra is a professional orchestra under the leadership of its Music Director Michael Butterman.

Founded in 1976 by Giora Bernstein, the Colorado Music Festival presents a summer series of concerts in Chautauqua Auditorium.

Founded in 1981, the Boulder Bach Festival is an annual festival celebrating the life, legacy, and music of J.S. Bach. The festival is led by Executive Director Zachary Carrettin and Artistic Director Mina Gajić.

Founded in 1988, Colorado MahlerFest celebrates the legacy of composer Gustav Mahler through an annual festival. Under Artistic Director Kenneth Woods, the Colorado MahlerFest Orchestra draws together young professionals, conservatory and university students, and advanced amateurs.

=== Dance ===
Boulder is home to multiple dance companies and establishments. Boulder Ballet was founded by former American Ballet Theatre dancer Larry Boyette in the 1970s as part of the Ballet Arts Studios. Lemon Sponge Cake Contemporary Ballet was founded in 2004 by Robert Sher-Machherndl, former principal dancer of the Dutch National Ballet and Bavarian State Ballet.

=== Conference on World Affairs ===
The Conference on World Affairs, started in 1948, is an annual one-week conference featuring dozens of discussion panels on contemporary issues.

=== eTown ===
The internationally syndicated radio program eTown has its headquarters at eTown Hall, at the intersection of 16th and Spruce Streets, in downtown Boulder. Most tapings of this weekly show are done at eTown Hall.

=== Polar Bear Plunge ===
Beginning in 1983, hundreds of people head to the Boulder Reservoir on New Year's Day to take part in the annual polar bear plunge. With rescue teams standing by, participants use a variety of techniques to plunge themselves into the freezing reservoir.

=== Naked Pumpkin Run ===
Starting in 1998, dozens of people have taken part in a Halloween run down the city's streets wearing only shoes and a hollowed-out pumpkin on their heads. In 2009, local police threatened participants with charges of indecent exposure, and no naked runners were reported in official newscasts, although a few naked runners were observed by locals. Several illegal attempts, resulting in arrests, have been made to restart the run, but no serious effort has been mounted.

=== Boulder Cruiser Ride ===
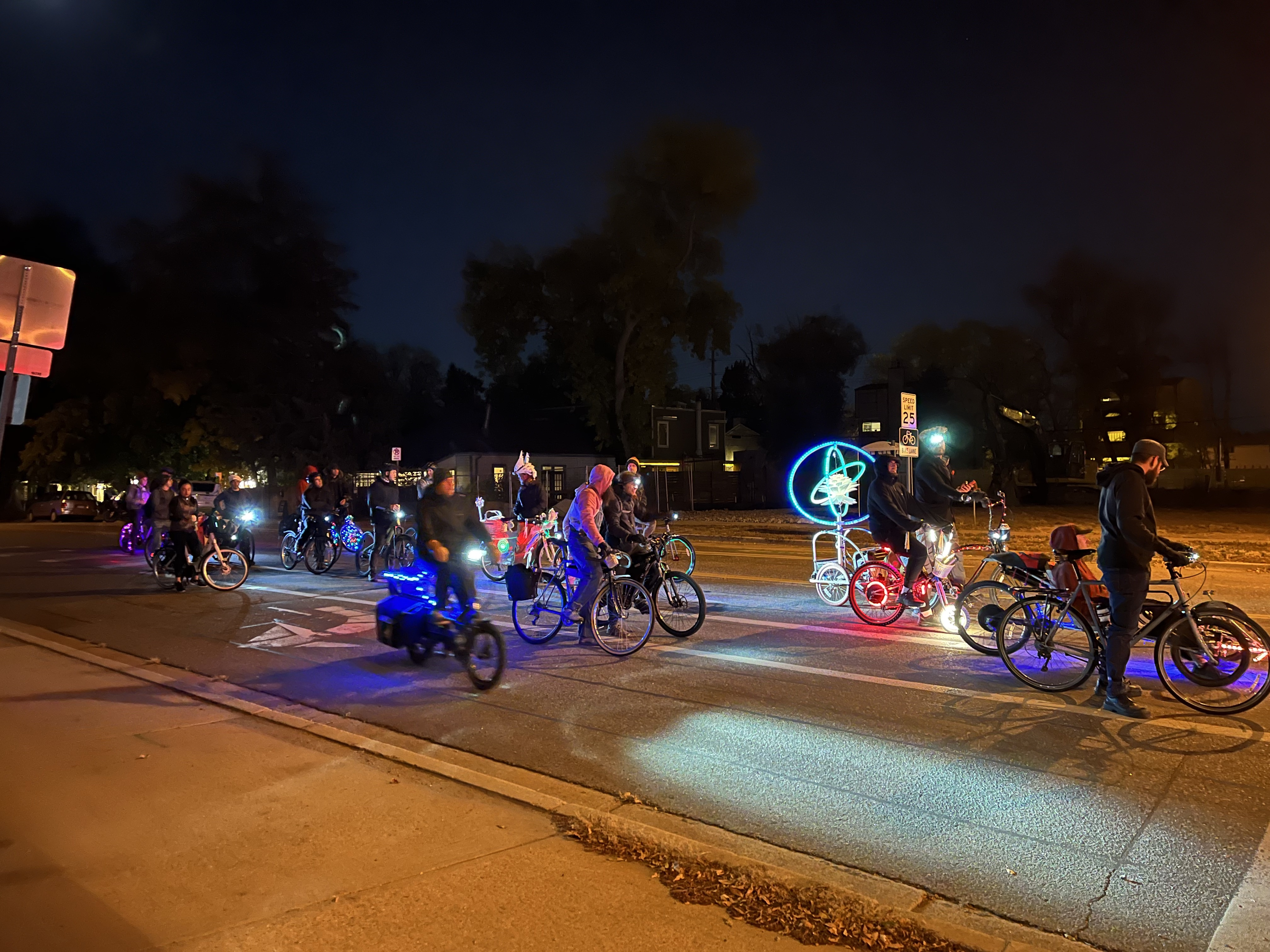
Bicycle riders joining together on Happy Thursday Cruiser Ride

The Happy Thursday Cruiser Ride is a weekly bicycle ride in Boulder Colorado. The Boulder Cruiser Ride grew from a group of friends and friends of friends in the early '90s riding bicycles around Boulder into the social cycling event it is today. Some enthusiasts gather wearing costumes and decorating their bikes; themes are an integral part of the cruiser tradition. Boulder Police began following the cruiser ride as it gained in popularity in the early 2000s.

Issues with underage drinking, reckless bicycle riding, and other nuisance complaints led organizers to drop the cruiser ride as a public event. Returning to an underground format, where enthusiasts must become part of the social network before gaining access to event sites, the Boulder Cruiser Ride has continued as a local tradition. On May 30, 2013, over 400 riders attended the Thursday-night Cruiser Ride in honor of "Big Boy", an elk that was shot and killed on New Year's Day by an on-duty Boulder Police officer.

=== World's Shortest St. Patrick's Day Parade ===
Each year, the Independent Order of Odd Fellows hosts what they claim is the world's shortest St. Patrick's Day Parade, which extends just one city block.

=== Boulder International Film Festival ===
Founded in 2005, the Boulder International Film Festival is held annually in March and showcases films in different venues around Boulder, including the Boulder Theater.

=== Sundance Film Festival ===
Starting in 2027, Boulder will become the new host for the Sundance Film Festival. Under the terms of the contract, the festival will be held in Boulder for 10 years until 2037, with an option to extend. Boulder is around 10x larger than the original (and only) host city Sundance was based in, Park City, Utah. Boulder defeated rival bids from Salt Lake City-Park City and Cincinnati.

== Parks and recreation ==
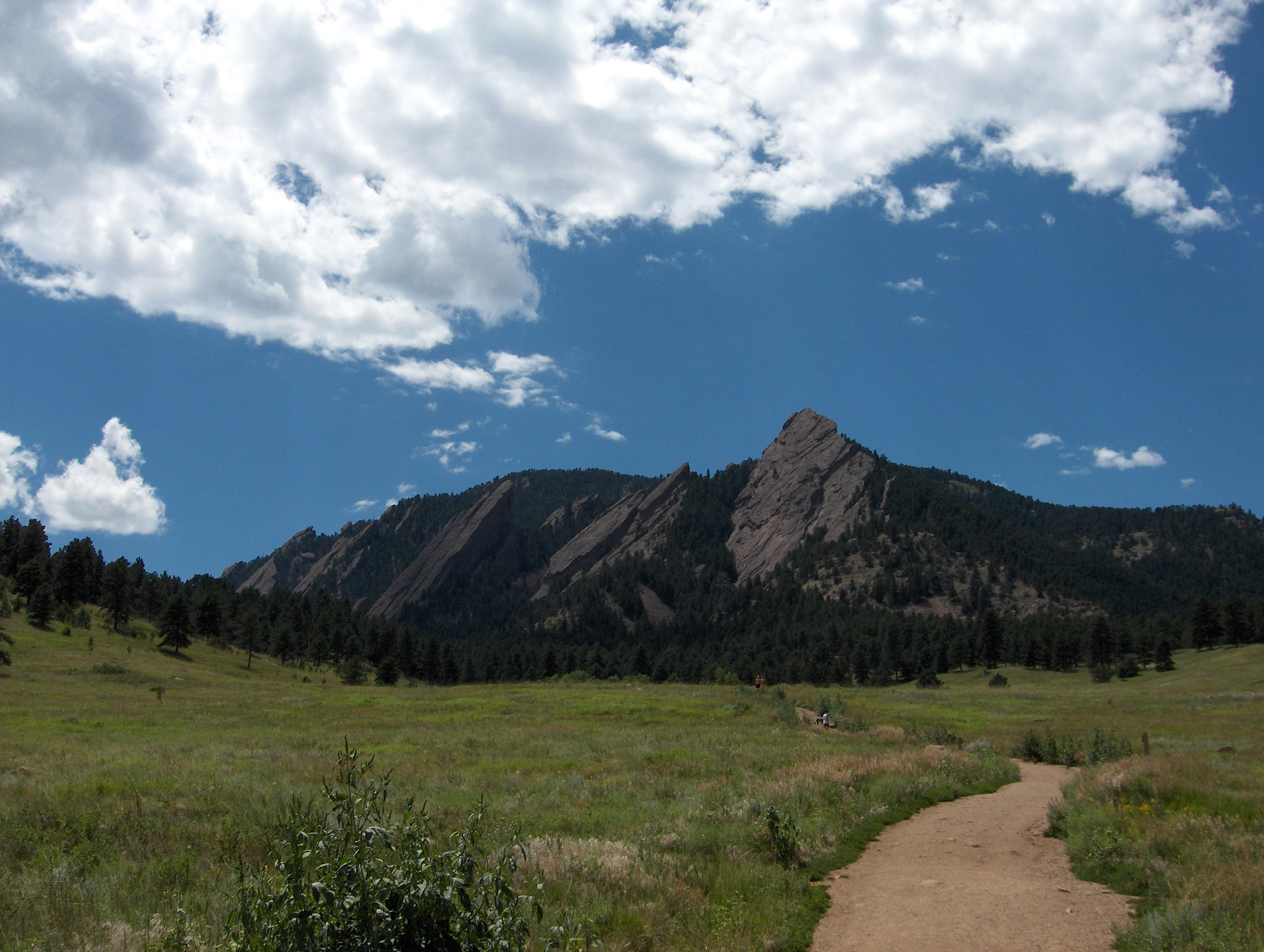
Trailheads for many popular hikes are located at Chautauqua Park.

Boulder is surrounded by thousands of acres of recreational open space, conservation easements, and nature preserves. Almost 60%, 35,584 acres (144.00 km^{2}), of open space totaling 61,529 acres (249.00 km^{2}) is open to the public.

The unincorporated community of Eldorado Springs, south of Boulder, is home to rock climbing routes. There are climbing routes available in the city open space, including climbing routes of varying difficulty on the Flatirons themselves (traditional protection). Boulder Canyon (sport), directly west of downtown Boulder, has many routes. All three of these areas are affected by seasonal closures for wildlife.

Every year on Groundhog Day, Boulder Open Space & Mountain Parks hosts a special event at the Chautauqua Ranger Cottage featuring Flatiron Freddy, a stuffed marmot instead of a groundhog.

== Government ==
Boulder is a home rule municipality, being self-governing under Article XX of the Constitution of the State of Colorado; Title 31, Article 1, Section 202 of the Colorado Revised Statutes.

Politically, Boulder is one of the most liberal and Democratic cities in Colorado when viewed from a Federal and State elections lens. As of May 2026, registered voters in Boulder County were 45.2% Democratic, 4.7% Republican, and 50.1% were unaffiliated or members of minor parties. By residents and detractors alike, Boulder is often referred to as the "People's Republic of Boulder".

In 1974, the Boulder City Council passed Colorado's first ordinance prohibiting discrimination based on sexual orientation. Boulder voters repealed the measure by referendum within a year. In 1975, Boulder County Clerk Clela Rorex was the second in the United States ever to grant same-sex marriage licenses, prior to state laws being passed to prevent such issuance.

In July 2019, Boulder declared a "climate emergency" and established target dates for achieving 100% renewable electricity, a reduction in greenhouse gas emissions from city organizations and facilities, an increase in local generation of electricity through renewable sources, and a reduction in greenhouse gas emissions from the community. The city created a community-centered process to focus on energy systems, regenerative ecosystems, circular materials economy, land use, and financial systems.

== Education ==
=== Public schools ===
The Boulder Valley School District (BVSD) administers the public school system in Boulder, aside from a few areas in northeast Boulder, where students attend the St. Vrain Valley School District.

=== Charter schools ===
Charter schools within the city of Boulder include Preparatory High School (9–12), Summit Middle School (6–8), and Horizons Alternative School (K–8).

=== Private schools ===
A variety of private high schools, middle schools and elementary schools operate in Boulder.

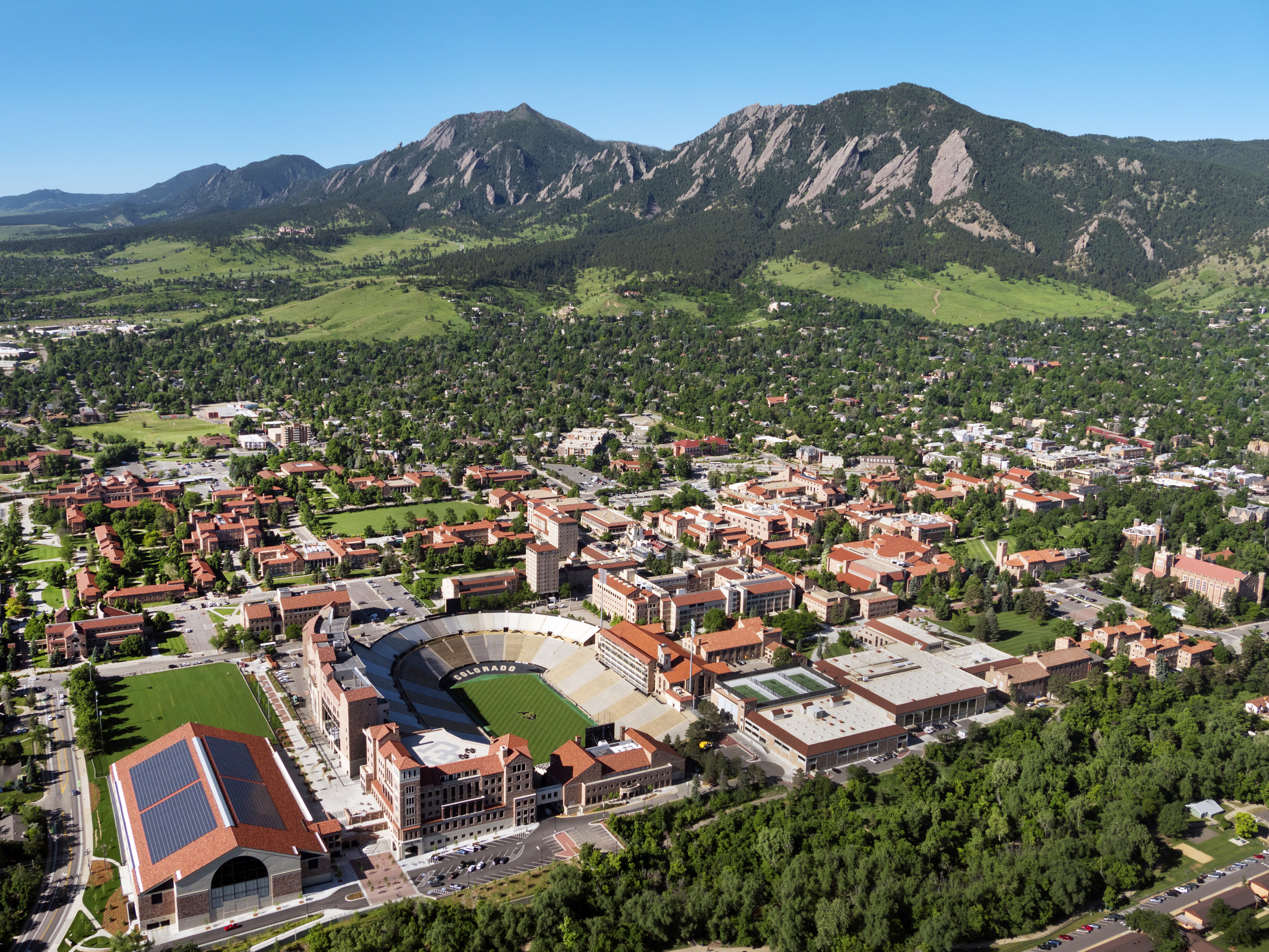
Boulder is home to the University of Colorado Boulder, flagship university of the University of Colorado system.

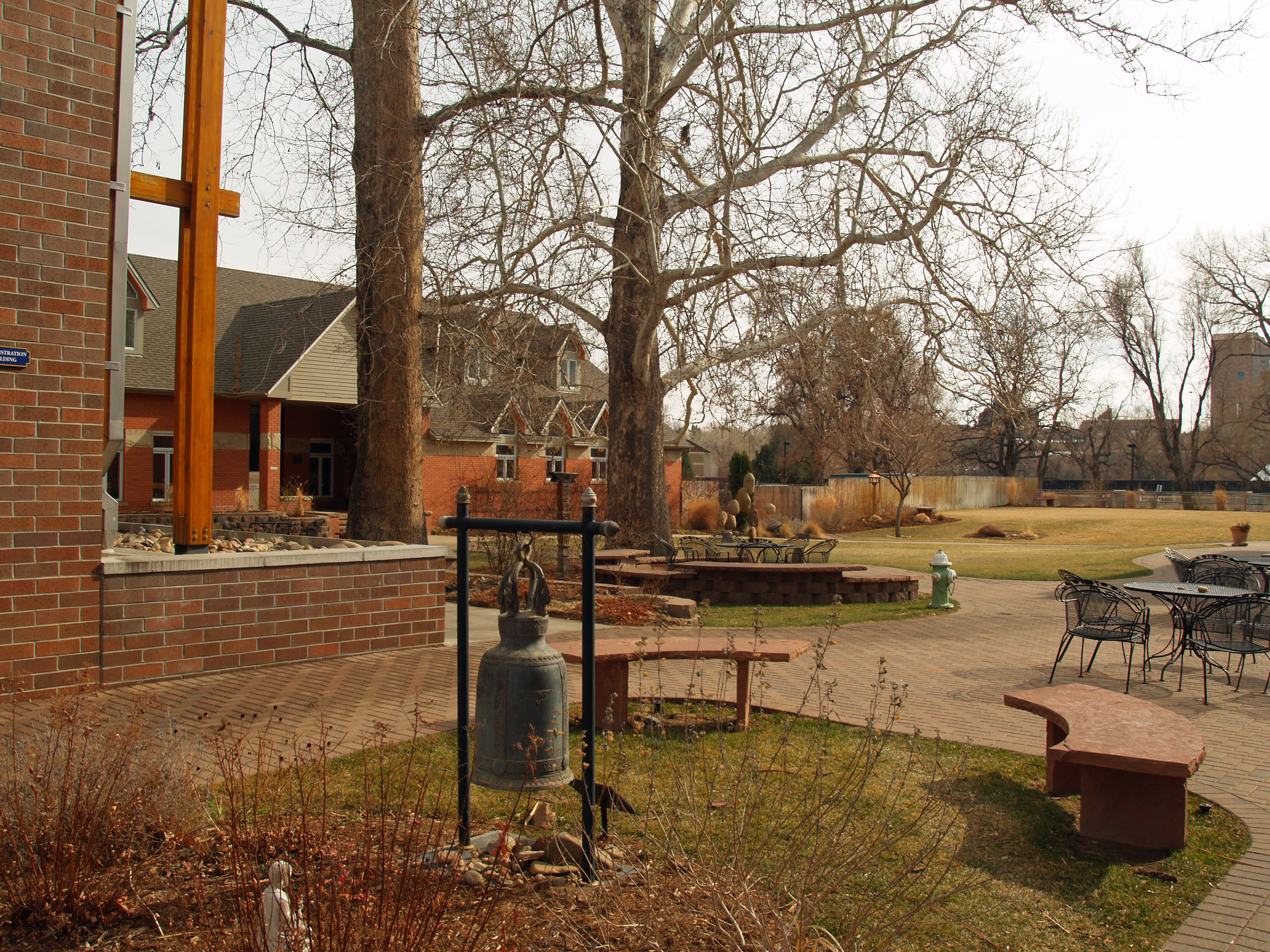
Part of the campus of Naropa University

=== Colleges and universities ===
- University of Colorado Boulder, a public university that contributes roughly 46,000 residents (30,000 undergraduate students, 7,000 graduate students and 10,000 staff/faculty) to the population.
- Naropa University is a private university based on Buddhist principles. It has approximately 400 undergraduate and over 600 graduate students.
- Auguste Escoffier School of Culinary Arts, a culinary school group with campuses in Boulder and Austin, Texas.

=== Science institutes ===
- Cooperative Institute for Research in Environmental Sciences (CIRES)
- Cooperative Institute for Research in the Atmosphere (CIRA)
- Center for Astrophysics and Space Astronomy (CASA)
- Colorado Center for Astrodynamics Research (CCAR)
- Geological Society of America
- Institute of Arctic and Alpine Research (INSTAAR)
- JILA (Formerly Joint Institute for Laboratory Astrophysics)
- Laboratory for Atmospheric and Space Physics (LASP)
- National Ecological Observatory Network (NEON)
- National Center for Atmospheric Research (NCAR) / University Corporation for Atmospheric Research (UCAR)
  - High Altitude Observatory (HAO)
- National Institute of Standards and Technology (NIST)
- National Oceanic and Atmospheric Administration (NOAA)
  - Earth System Research Laboratories (ESRL)
  - Space Weather Prediction Center (SWPC)
- National Snow and Ice Data Center (NSIDC)
- National Solar Observatory (NSO)
- National Telecommunications and Information Administration (NTIA) – Institute for Telecommunication Sciences Boulder
- Renewable and Sustainable Energy Institute (RASEI)
- Rocky Mountain Institute
- Southwest Research Institute Department of Space Studies
- Space Science Institute
- UNAVCO National Science Foundation's Geodetic Facility
- United States Geological Survey (USGS)

== Media ==
Boulder's main daily newspaper, the Daily Camera, was founded in 1890 as the weekly Boulder Camera, and became a daily newspaper in 1891. The Colorado Daily was started in 1892 as a university newspaper for CU Boulder. Following many heated controversies over Colorado Daily's political coverage, it severed its ties to the university in 1971. From 1996 to 2000, the Boulder Planet competed with the Boulder Weekly as a free weekly.

Newspaper conglomerate Scripps acquired the Colorado Daily in 2005 after its acquisition of the Camera in 1997, leaving the Boulder Weekly as the only locally owned newspaper in Boulder. Scripps relinquished its 50 percent ownership in both daily papers in early 2009 to Media News Group. Boulder Magazine, a lifestyle magazine, was founded in 1978. Boulder Magazine is published three times per year.

Boulder is part of the Denver market for television stations, and it receives many radio stations based in Denver or Ft. Collins. For cable television, Boulder is served by Comcast Cable. The city operates public service Boulder 8 TV on cable (high- and standard-definition), which airs, live-streams and archives council meetings. With its in-house video production facilities, it also produces news, talk and informational programming. Over-the-air television reception is poor in the western part of the city because of interference from mountains.

Non-commercial community radio station KGNU was founded in 1978 and commercial music station KBCO in 1977. KBCO programs an adult album alternative format and is owned and operated by iHeartMedia. KBCO moved its studios from Boulder to the Denver Tech Center in 2010. It maintains the Boulder license and transmits from atop Eldorado Mountain south of Boulder.

KVCU, also known as Radio 1190, is a non-commercial radio station run with the help of university-student volunteers. KVCU started broadcasting in 1998.

NPR programming is heard over KCFC 1490 AM, operated by Colorado Public Radio, and simulcasting Denver station KCFR 90.1.

KRKS-FM 94.7, owned and operated by Salem Media Group and affiliated with SRN News, offers a Christian talk and teaching format, and has its transmitter located on Lee Hill, northwest of Boulder.

The University of Colorado Press, a non-profit co-op of various western universities, publishes academic books, as do Lynne Rienner Publishers, Paradigm Publishers, and Westview Press. Paladin Press book/video publishers and Soldier of Fortune magazine both have their headquarters in Boulder. Paladin Press was founded in September 1970 by Peder Lund and Robert K. Brown. In 1974, Lund bought out Brown's share of the press, and Brown founded Soldier of Fortune magazine in 1975.

== Infrastructure ==
=== Transportation ===
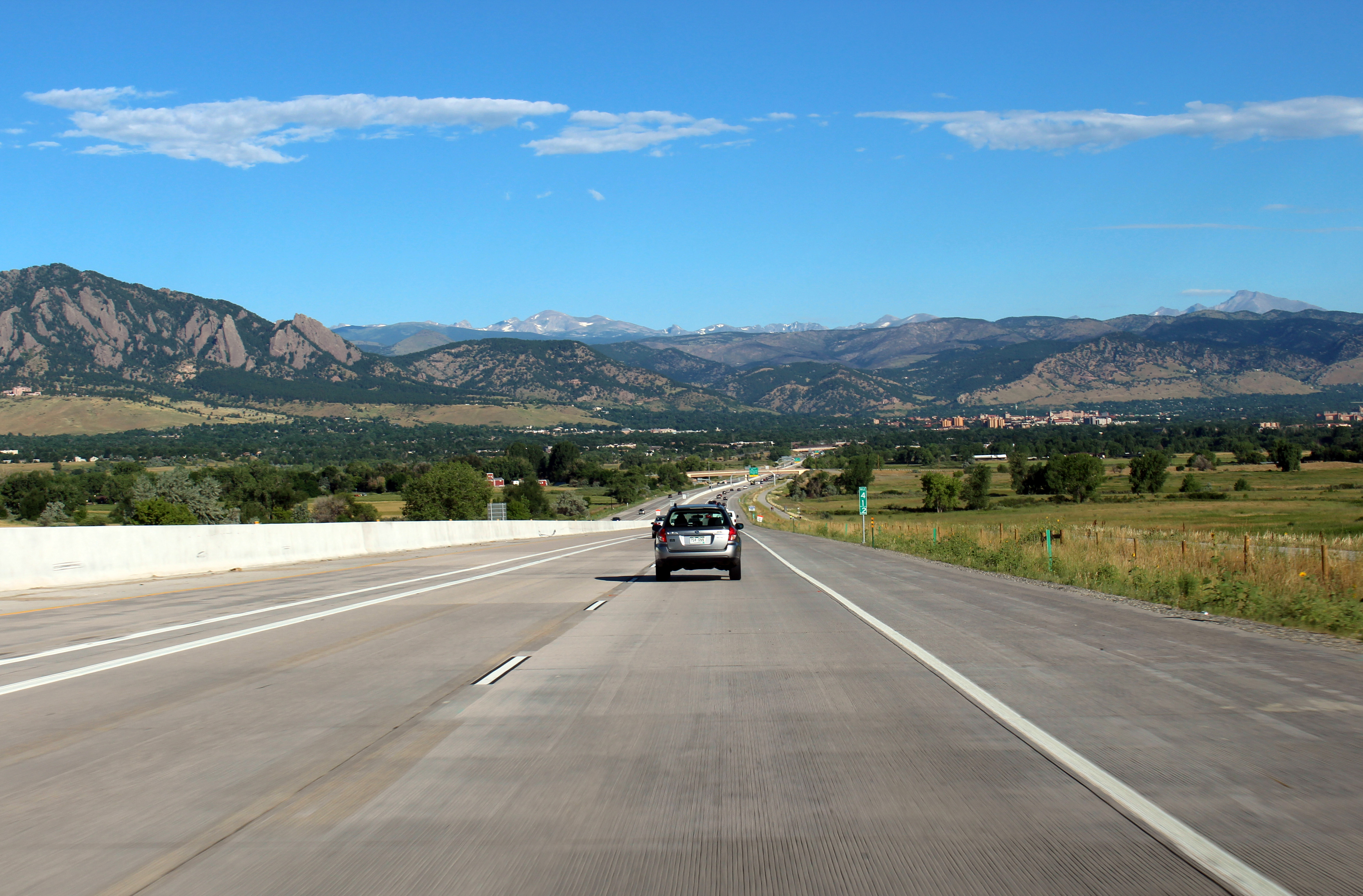
The city from northbound US 36 as the highway descends into Boulder

Since Boulder has operated under residential growth control ordinances since 1976, new residential construction has been severely limited. However, commercial and employment growth has continued, resulting in an imbalance where job growth has far outstripped population growth. Considerable road traffic enters the city each morning and leaves each afternoon, since many employees live in Longmont, Lafayette, Louisville, Broomfield, Westminster, and Denver. Boulder is served by US 36 and a variety of state highways. Parking regulations in Boulder have been explicitly designed to discourage parking by commuters and to encourage the use of mass transit, with mixed results.

Over the years, Boulder has made significant investments in the multi-modal network. The city is now well known for its grade-separated bicycle and pedestrian paths, which are integrated into a network of bicycle lanes, cycle tracks, and on-street bicycle routes. Boulder provides a community transit network that connects downtown, the University of Colorado campuses, and local shopping amenities. Boulder has no rail transit. Local and regional shuttle buses are funded by a variety of sources. Due in part to these investments in pedestrian, bicycle, and transit infrastructure, Boulder has been recognized both nationally and internationally for its transportation system.

In 2009, the Boulder metropolitan statistical area (MSA) ranked as the fourth highest in the United States for percentage of commuters who biked to work, at 5.4 percent. In 2013, the Boulder MSA ranked as the fourth lowest in the United States for percentage of workers who commuted by private automobile, at 71.9 percent. During the same time period, 11.1 percent of Boulder area workers had no commute whatsoever: they worked out of the home.

==== Bus service ====
Boulder has an extensive bus system operated by the Regional Transportation District (RTD). The HOP, SKIP, JUMP, Bound, DASH and Stampede routes run throughout the city and connect to nearby communities with departures every ten to fifteen minutes during peak hours, Monday-Friday. Other routes, such as the 204, 205, 206, 208 and 209 depart every 30 to 60 minutes. Regional routes traveling between nearby cities such as Longmont (BOLT, J), Golden (GS), and Denver (Flatiron Flyer, a bus rapid transit route), as well as Denver International Airport (AB), are also available. There are over 100 scheduled daily bus trips on seven routes that run between Boulder and Denver on weekdays.

==== Railroads ====
Freight service is provided by Union Pacific and BNSF.

Currently there is no intercity passenger service. The last remaining services connecting the Front Range cities ceased with the formation of Amtrak in 1971.

===== Future transit plans =====
Front Range Passenger Rail is a current proposal (as of 2023) to link the cities from Pueblo in the south, north to Fort Collins and possibly to Cheyenne, Wyoming.

A 41-mile (66 km) RTD commuter rail route called the Northwest Rail Line, also known as the B Line, is proposed to run from Denver through Boulder to Longmont, with stops in major communities along the way. The Boulder station is to be north of Pearl Street and east of 30th Street. At one time, this commuter rail service was scheduled to commence in 2014, but major delays have ensued. In 2016, an initial 6-mile (9.7 km) segment opened, reaching from downtown Denver to southern Westminster at Westminster Station. The remaining 35 miles (56 km) of the Northwest Rail Line is planned to be completed by 2044, depending upon funding.

These future transit plans, as well as the current Flatiron Flyer Bus Rapid Transit route, are part of FasTracks, an RTD transit improvement plan funded by a 0.4% increase in the sales tax throughout the Denver metro area. RTD, the developer of FasTracks, is partnering with the city of Boulder to plan a transit-oriented development near Pearl and 33rd Streets in association with the proposed Boulder commuter rail station. The development is to feature the Boulder Railroad Depot, already relocated to that site, which may be returned to a transit-related use.

==== Cycling ====
Boulder, well known for its bicycle culture, has hundreds of miles of bicycle-pedestrian paths, lanes, and routes that interconnect to create a network of bikeways usable year-round. Boulder has 74 bike and pedestrian underpasses that facilitate safer and uninterrupted travel throughout much of the city. The city offers a route-finding website that allows users to map personalized bike routes around the city, and is one of five communities to have received a "Platinum Bicycle Friendly Community" rating from the League of American Bicyclists.

The headquarters of the free and non-obligatory hospitality exchange network for cyclists, Warm Showers, is based in Boulder.

In May 2011, B-cycle bike-sharing opened in Boulder with 100 red bikes and 12 stations.

==== Airport ====
Boulder Municipal Airport is located 3 miles (4.8 km) northeast of central Boulder, is owned by the City of Boulder and is used exclusively for general aviation, with most traffic consisting of single-engine airplanes and glider aircraft.

== Notable people ==
- Al Bartlett, emeritus professor of physics
- Jello Biafra, Dead Kennedys punk rock band frontman
- Tony Boselli, five-time Pro Bowl offensive tackle
- Bill Bower, the last surviving pilot who took part in the Doolittle Raid
- Arleigh Burke, United States Navy Admiral and Chief of Naval Operations
- Scott Carpenter, Project Mercury astronaut
- Thomas Cech, chemist who shared the 1989 Nobel Prize in Chemistry
- Alonzo Clemons, sculptor and autistic savant
- Nathan Clurman (born 1998), ice hockey player
- Jack Collom, poet and essayist
- Kristin Davis, Sex and the City actress
- Joey "CoCo" Diaz, resident during the 1980s and 1990s
- John Fante, writer
- Justine Frischmann, British artist and former lead singer of Elastica
- Andrea Gibson, spoken word artist, poet, activist
- Allen Ginsberg, poet, taught at Naropa University and lived much of his life in Boulder
- Michael Grab, Canadian-born artist specializing in rock balancing and photography
- Tyler Haney, founder of Outdoor Voices
- Matt Hasselbeck, three-time Pro Bowl quarterback
- Carrie Ingalls (Little House on the Prairie), lived in Boulder 1905–1906
- Lauren Jortberg, Olympic cross-country skier
- Scott Jurek, ultramarathoner, writer and public speaker
- Hanna Kroeger, vendor of health food and alternative medicine products
- Eagle Wynne McMahon, professional disc golf player
- Kimbal Musk, entrepreneur, philanthropist, and restaurateur
- Chief Niwot, or Left Hand, a tribal leader of the Arapaho, lived at the site of Boulder
- Shane O'Neil, soccer player for Toronto FC
- Chuck Pagano, former Indianapolis Colts head coach
- Phil Plait, "The Bad Astronomer", astronomer, skeptic, writer and science blogger
- Jared Polis, governor of Colorado
- JonBenét Ramsey, child beauty pageant winner murdered in December 1996
- Bobby Regester, racing driver
- Gerry Roach, climber
- Larry Sellers, actor, lived in town
- Lidia Șimon (born 1973), retired Romanian Olympic long-distance runner
- Isaac Slade, musician with rock band The Fray
- Ariel Solomon (born 1968), American football offensive lineman
- Edward Tatum (1909–1975), geneticist, born in Boulder
- Maor Tiyouri (born 1990), Israeli Olympic marathon runner
- Thatcher Wine, author and CEO of Boulder-based Juniper Books
- Evans Woollen III, architect
- Joanna Zeiger (born 1970), Olympic triathlete, 2008 Ironman 70.3 world champion

== In popular culture ==
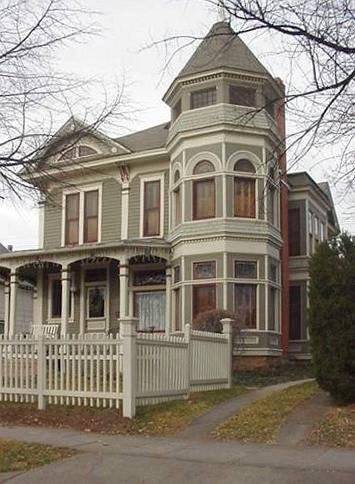
1619 Pine Street was used for the exterior shots of Mindy's house on the TV show Mork & Mindy.

Woody Allen's film Sleeper (1973) was filmed on location in Boulder. Some houses and the Mesa Laboratory of the National Center for Atmospheric Research, designed by I. M. Pei, were used in the film.

Boulder was a setting for Stephen King's book The Stand (1978), as the gathering point for some of the survivors of the superflu. King lived in Boulder for a little less than a year, beginning in the autumn of 1974, and wrote The Shining (1977) during this period.

The television sitcom Mork & Mindy (1978–1982) was set in Boulder, with 1619 Pine St. serving as the exterior shot of Mindy's home. The New York Deli, a now closed restaurant in the Pearl Street Mall, was also featured prominently in the series.

In the American version of the television sitcom The Office, the character Michael Scott leaves the show in season 7 and moves with his fiancée to Boulder.

"Boulder to Birmingham" is a song written by Emmylou Harris and Bill Danoff which first appeared on Harris's 1975 album Pieces of the Sky. It has served as something of a signature tune for the artist and recounts her feelings of grief in the years following the death of country rock star and mentor Gram Parsons.

The Comedy Central television show Broad City ends with the protagonist, Abby, moving to Boulder for an art fellowship.

Significant parts of the 2006 movie Catch and Release were filmed in Boulder, and includes many well-known Boulder institutions such as Celestial Seasonings, the Boulder Farmer's Market, and Pearl Street Mall.

== Sister cities ==
Boulder's sister cities are:

- Dushanbe, Tajikistan (1987)
- Jalapa, Nueva Segovia Department, Nicaragua (1983)
- Kathmandu, Nepal (2018)
- Kisumu, Kenya (2008)
- Lhasa, Tibet Autonomous Region, China (1986)
- El Mante, Tamaulipas, Mexico (2000)
- Nablus, West Bank, Palestine (2016)
- Ramat HaNegev, Southern District, Israel (2018)
- Yamagata, Yamagata, Japan (1994)
- Yateras, Guantánamo Province, Cuba (2002)

Landmarks representing Boulder's connection with its various sister cities can be found throughout the city. Boulder's Sister City Plaza – dedicated on May 17, 2007 – is located on the east lawn of Boulder's Municipal Building. The plaza was built to honor all of Boulder's sister city relationships.

The Dushanbe Tea House is located on 13th Street just south of the Pearl Street Mall. Dushanbe presented its distinctive tea house as a gift to Boulder in 1987. It was completed in Tajikistan in 1990 and then shipped to Boulder, where it was reassembled and opened to the public in 1998.

A mural representing the relationship between Boulder and Mante, Mexico, was dedicated in August 2001. The mural, which was painted by Mante muralist Florian Lopez, is located on the north-facing wall of the Dairy Center for the Performing Arts.

== See also ==
- Boulder, CO Metropolitan Statistical Area
- Denver-Aurora-Greeley, CO Combined Statistical Area
- Front Range Urban Corridor
