= Fourmile =

Fourmile or Four Mile may refer to:

== Canyons and bodies of water ==
- Fourmile Canyon and Fourmile Creek, west of Boulder, Colorado, the site of a major wildfire in 2010
- Fourmile Canyon Creek (north of Boulder, Colorado)
- Fourmile Canyon (Fremont County, Colorado) and the associated Fourmile Creek
- Fourmile Creek (Chaffee County, Colorado)
- Four Mile Creek (Walton County, Florida)
- Fourmile Creek (Iowa)
- Fourmile Creek (Neosho River tributary), a stream in Kansas
- Fourmile Creek (Whitewater River tributary), a stream in Kansas, a tributary of Whitewater River (Kansas)
- Four Mile Creek (Ohio)
- Fourmile Creek (Pennsylvania) in northwestern Pennsylvania
- Fourmile Creek (Belle Fourche River), a stream in South Dakota
- Fourmile Creek (Moreau River), a stream in South Dakota
- Fourmile Creek (Wood County, Wisconsin)
- Fourmile Lake (disambiguation)
- Four Mile Run in Virginia
- Four Mile Waterhole, Northern Territory, Australia

== Parks and trails ==
- Four Mile Creek State Park in New York State
- Four Mile Historic Park, on Cherry Creek, three miles east of downtown Denver, Colorado
- Four Mile Run Trail in Virginia
- Fourmile Creek Natural Area, a protected area in Park County, Colorado, USA

== Communities ==
=== United States ===
- Fourmile, Alabama
- Four Mile Road, Alaska
- Four Mile Township, Polk County, Iowa
- Four Mile Township, Wayne County, Illinois
- Fourmile, Kentucky
- Four Mile, New Jersey
- Four Mile, Ohio
- Four Mile, South Dakota
- Four Mile, West Virginia

=== Other places ===
- Four Mile, Papua New Guinea
- Four Mile, Western Australia
- Four Mile Creek, Tasmania, Australia

== Other uses ==
- Four Mile Cliff, Antarctica
- Four Mile uranium mine in Australia
- Henrietta Fourmile, birth name of Australian scholar Henrietta Marrie
