= Gold Miner Hotel =

- U.S. National Register of Historic Places
- U.S. Historic district – Contributing property
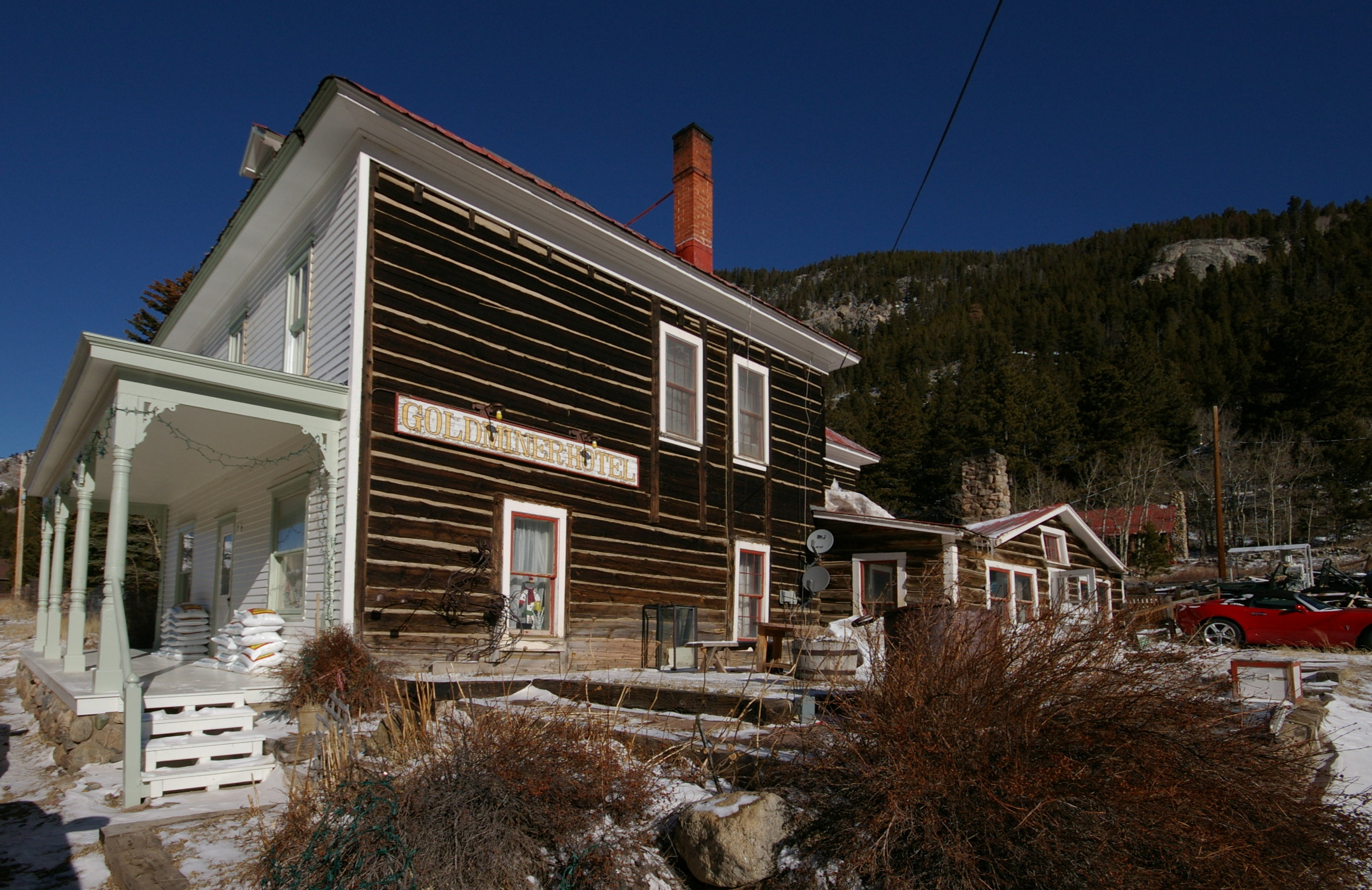

- Location within Colorado
- Location: 601 Klondyke Ave., Eldora, Colorado
- Coordinates: 39.95004°N 105.57022°W
- Area: less than one acre
- Built: 1898-99, 1934
- Built by: Randall, I.J.; Randall, J.M.
- Architectural style: Late Victorian, Log
- Part of: Eldora Historic District (ID89000978)
- MPS: Metal Mining and Tourist Era Resources of Boulder County MPS
- NRHP reference No.: 97000657

Significant dates
- Added to NRHP: July 3, 1997
- Designated CP: October 4, 1989

The Gold Miner Hotel or Goldminer Hotel, at 601 Klondyke Ave. in Eldora, Colorado in Boulder County, Colorado, was built in 1898. It was listed on the National Register of Historic Places in 1997, and the registration's property borders were amended in 2007.

A two-story portion of the current hotel, including a front clapboard facade and a porch, is from the original 1899 construction. The clapboard is over squared, milled logs, which are not covered on the sides. A one-story 1934 log addition to the rear is also historic. The squared logs are joined by half-dovetail notching.

It is a salient property in the Eldora Historic District, its centerpiece.

In 1997 the hotel was operated as a bed and breakfast.

== See also ==
- National Register of Historic Places listings in Boulder County, Colorado
