= Switzerland Trail =

Historic narrow gauge railroad line in Colorado

Coordinates: 40°01′20.0″N 105°27′47.3″W

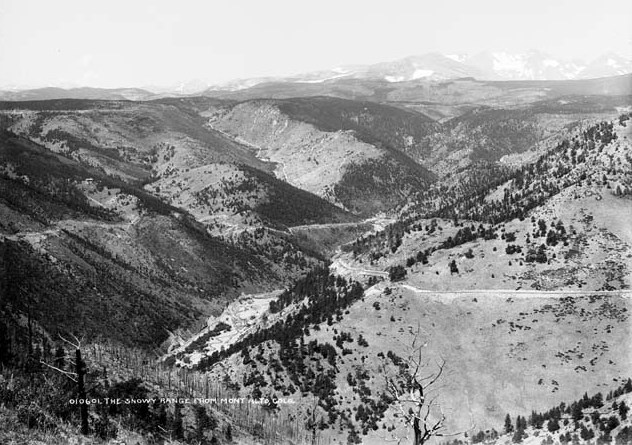
View of the railroads that became the Switzerland Trail, by William Henry Jackson, 1900. This copy has annotations identifying the railroads and the town of Sunset, Colorado (at right center).

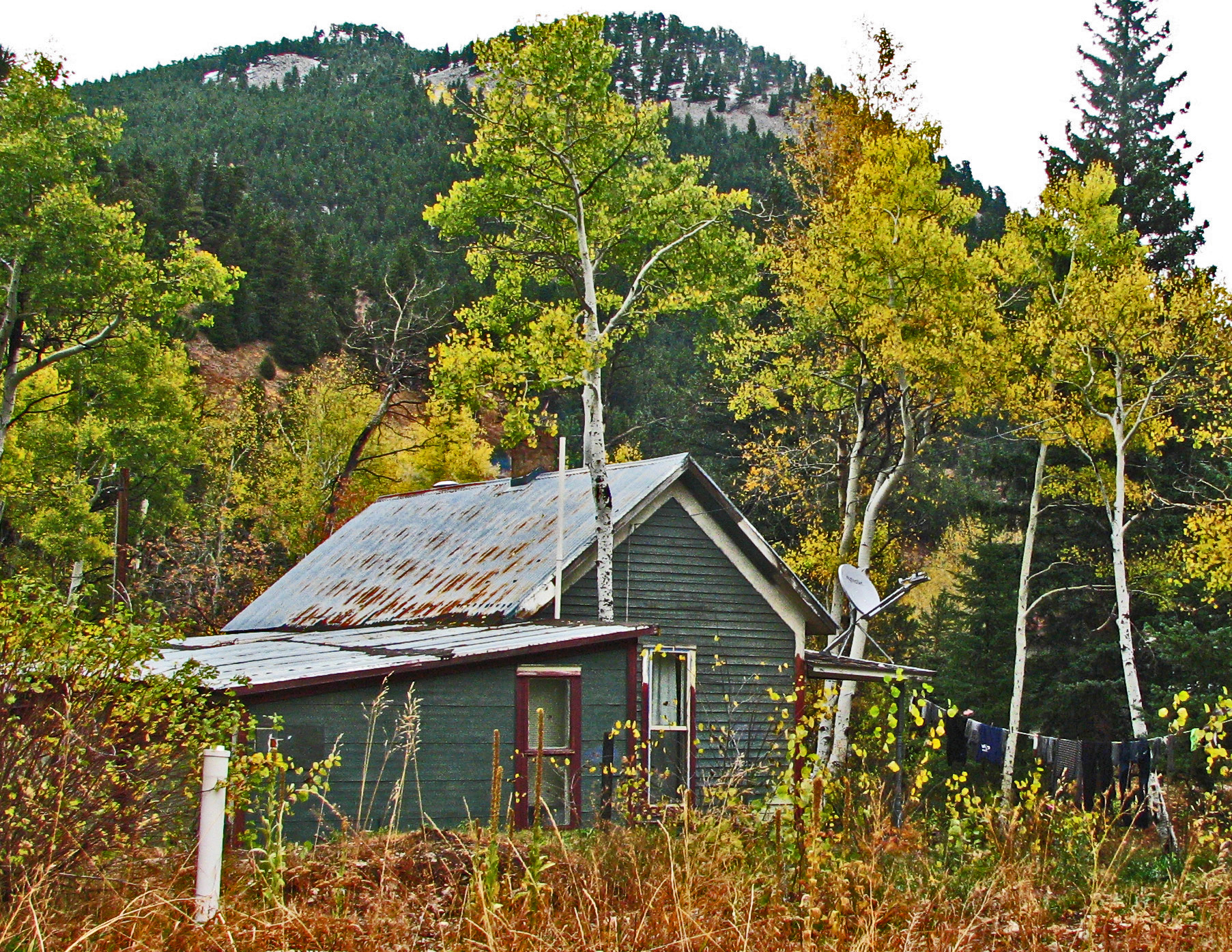
Sunset, Colorado townsite. This house appeared to be the only occupied dwelling in 2010.

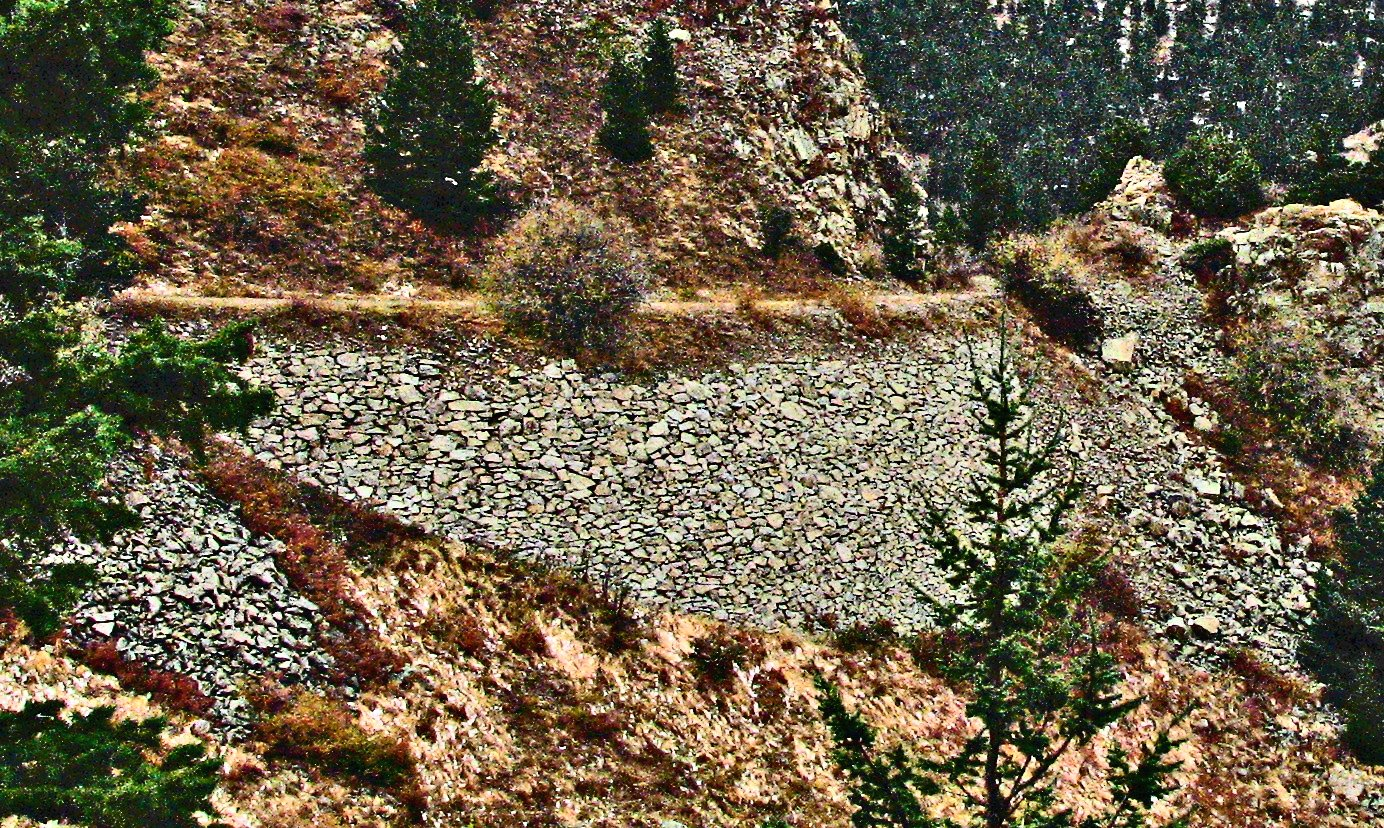
Switzerland Trail above Sunset townsite. Note the well-preserved rockwork on the old railroad embankment. 2010 photo by Don O'Brien.

The Switzerland Trail is the site of a historic 3 ft (914 mm) narrow gauge railroad line that was operated at different times by the Greeley, Salt Lake and Pacific Railway (GSL&P), the Colorado and Northwestern Railroad (C&N), and the Denver, Boulder, and Western Railroad (DB&W) around the turn of the 20th century in the Colorado Front Range mining area near Nederland, Gold Hill, and Ward. The west end of the trail is listed on the National Register of Historic Places as the "Denver, Boulder and Western Railway Historic District".

== Description ==
The earliest segment of the trail dates to 1883, with continual track growth until 1894 by the GSL&P, when a large flood destroyed many tracks and bankrupted the company. In 1896 the line was reopened as the C&N took over, completing many spur lines and the southern branch of the Switzerland Trail. The C&N is responsible for the name "Switzerland Trail", given in 1898 in a successful attempt to attract the tourist trade. By the end of the 1800s, the C&N had folded and the DB&W took over. In 1919, the line was shut down and the tracks were subsequently pulled up, but the roadbed remains. A large portion of the roadbed is "maintained" (benignly neglected) as a hiking and biking trail as part of the Boulder County road system. It was, and remains, well known for its beautiful scenic views of the Front Range hills.

The remaining mountain route, about 30 miles (48 km) long, winds between altitudes of 7,000 and over 9,000 feet, from the townsite of Eldora, Colorado, past Nederland, on north through Sugar Loaf and, ultimately, Ward. The line winds past several local historically prominent mines, including the Blue Bird Mine and a few miles from the Caribou Mine in the then-bustling (now ghost-) town of Caribou. The main line originated in Boulder, Colorado, coming up Fourmile Canyon through the mining communities of Salina, Colorado and Crisman, Colorado. It was connected via a three-rail track shared with 4 ft 8 1/2 in (1,435 mm) standard gauge railroads to Denver, Colorado.

In its heyday, near the turn of the twentieth century, the Switzerland Trail was the major source of bulk transportation in the area, carrying supplies and tourists to mining camps and towns in the Front Range, ore from the myriad mines to a few centralized mills, and refined metal down to Boulder for transport to the rest of the nation. A federal ore assay office, built at the turn of the 20th century, was located near the now-sleepy community of Wall Street, Colorado, at the intersection of the Switzerland Trail route with Fourmile Canyon. At the time, Sunset was a bustling community, driven by the presence of an ore mill and the railroad. The building remains and is now something of a curiosity: the James F. Bailey Assay Office Museum, located in Wallstreet, Colorado, now a somewhat remote grouping of houses at least 20 minutes by car from the nearest town (Boulder). The C&N and the DB&W railroads were more canny than the GSL&P, and did a brisk business transporting tourists from Boulder and Denver up into the mountains. Several dedicated park sites and hotels (including the Mont Alto park site, its location now marked by a sign) were built or encouraged by the railroad to draw day-trippers.

The demise of the line came from a variety of factors, including: the extremely harsh winter conditions in the Rocky Mountains, which limited the tourist trade to about four months per year, forced frequent line closures, and periodically killed train crews; the invention and rise of the automobile; mine closures in Ward and Eldora; and failure of several ventures including a long tunnel/adit mine that was to be dug from Sunset into rich underground gold seams to the northwest.

The Switzerland Trail remains a well known hiking, OHV, motorcycle, 4x4, and biking trail because the smooth grade and 2%-5% slope of the railway make an easy traverse, while the narrowness of the railbed (typically 8–10 ft (2.4–3.0 m) wide) brings users close to the spectacular terrain.

== See also ==
- Fourmile Canyon
