= Fourmile, Alabama =

- Unincorporated community
- Location within Alabama Location within the United States
- Coordinates: 33°14′55″N 86°33′11″W
- Country: United States
- State: Alabama
- County: Shelby
- Elevation: 463 ft (141 m)
- Time zone: UTC-6 (Central (CST))
  - Summer (DST): UTC-5 (CDT)
- Area codes: 205, 659
- GNIS feature ID: 156374

Fourmile, also known as Redlawn, is an unincorporated community in Shelby County, Alabama, United States. Fourmile is located 4 miles (6.4 km) northeast of Columbiana and 3 miles (4.8 km) west of Wilsonville. Some of the early settlers of Fourmile came from Lexington County and Newberry County, South Carolina.

Fourmile Baptist Church was founded on August 25, 1824, (under the name of Bethesda Baptist Church) and is the oldest continuously functioning church in the Shelby Baptist Association. The Shelby Baptist Association was founded at Bethesda Baptist Church in 1852. It is also one of the oldest existing churches of the Alabama Baptist Convention. One of the prominent early members of the church was John W. Teague, who was an early settler of Columbiana and the father of Eldred B. Teague. E. B. Teague lived on a farm in Fourmile, which he named Red Lawn. Fourmile was also the location of Blue Springs Methodist Church, which was founded in 1890. The church closed in 2004.

A post office was established under the name Redlawn in 1898, at the residence of Pickens Miner, who served as the first postmaster. The post office was in operation until 1904.

One site in Fourmile, Jackson's Fourmile Farm, is listed on the Alabama Register of Landmarks and Heritage.

== Gallery ==
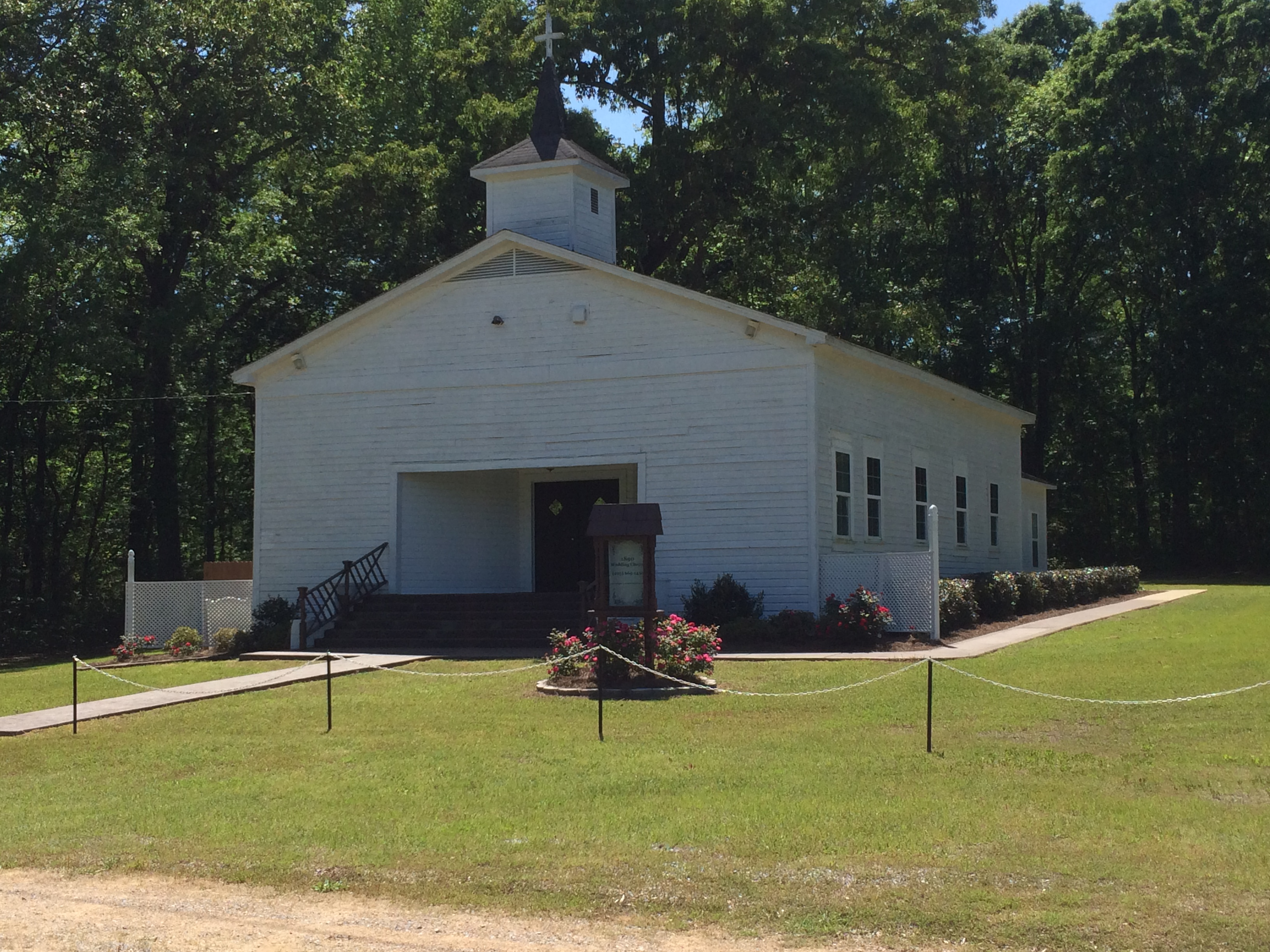
The former Blue Springs Methodist Church.

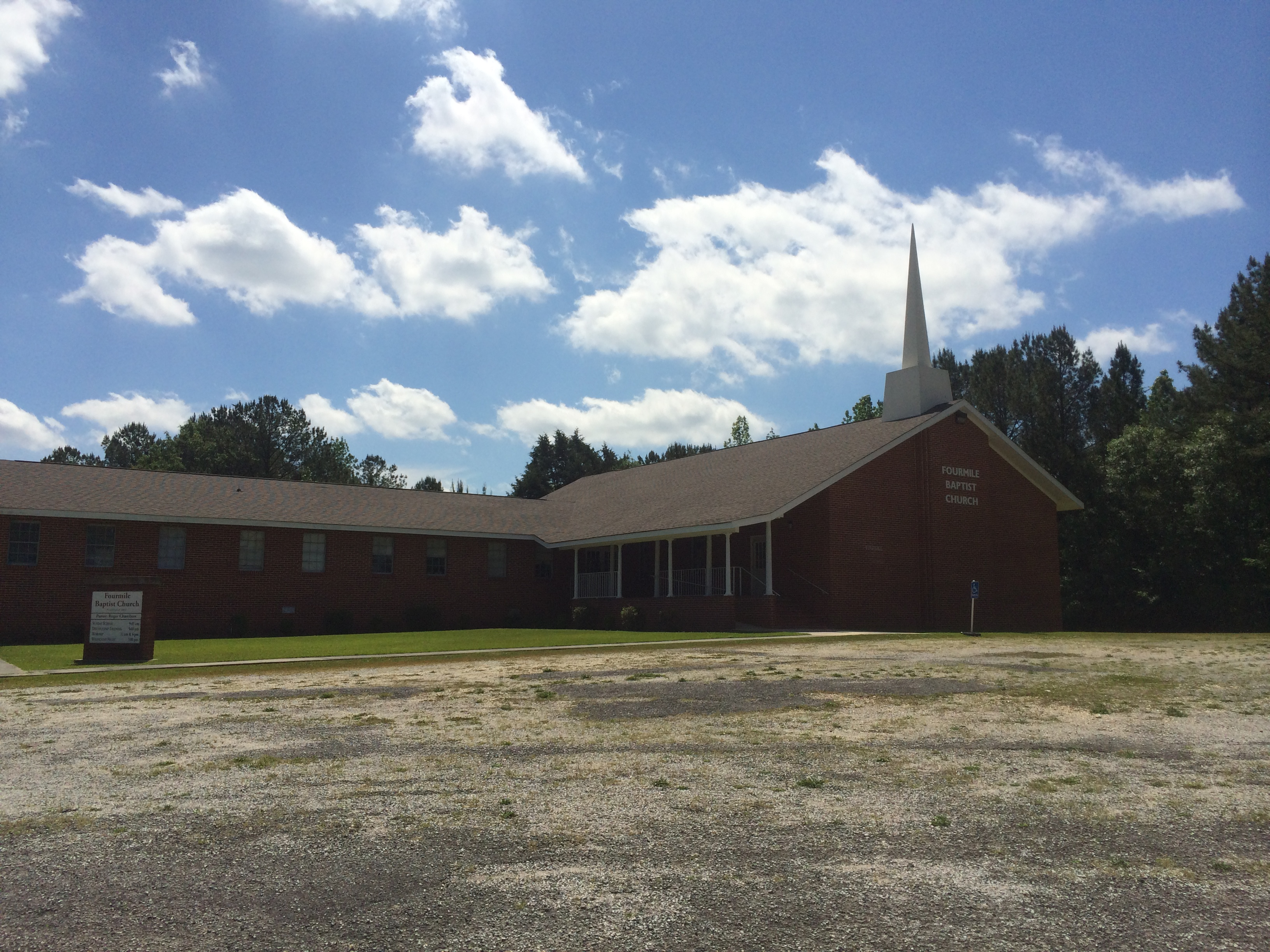
Fourmile Baptist Church
