= Four Mile Township, Polk County, Iowa =

Township in Polk County, Iowa, U.S.

Coordinates: 41.571°N 93.478°W

Four Mile Township is a township in Polk County, Iowa, United States.

== History ==
Four Mile Township was established in 1847. It took its name from Fourmile Creek.
