= Eldora Historic District =

Historic district in Colorado, United States

- U.S. National Register of Historic Places
- U.S. Historic district
- Colorado State Register of Historic Properties
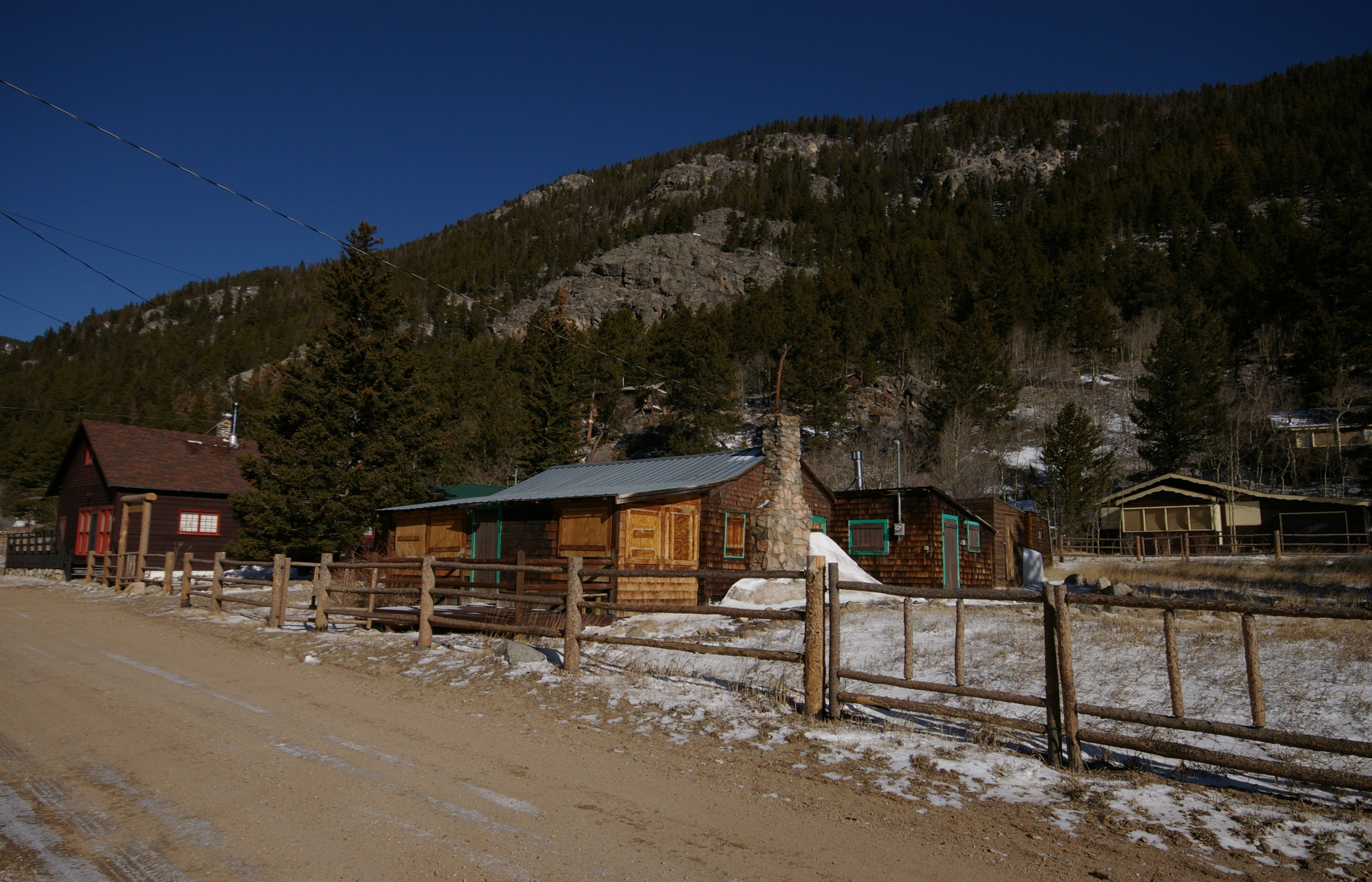

- Location within Colorado Location within the United States
- Location: Roughly Eaton Pl., 6th, Pearl, and 4th Sts., Huron Ave., 6th St., Eldorado Ave., and 7th St., Klondyke Ave. & Tenth St., Eldora, Colorado
- Coordinates: 39°57′1″N 105°34′17″W
- Area: 30 acres (12 ha)
- Built: 1893
- Architectural style: Late 19th And 20th Century Revivals, Rustic
- MPS: Metal Mining and Tourist Era Resources of Boulder County MPS
- NRHP reference No.: 89000978
- CSRHP No.: 5BL.758
- Added to NRHP: October 4, 1989

Eldora Historic District is a 30 acres (12 ha) historic district in Eldora, Colorado. Other names of the district and/or other historic names of places in the district are Happy Valley, Eldorado Camp, and 5BL758. It was listed on the National Register of Historic Places in 1989. The listing included 55 contributing buildings and 12 non-contributing ones.

The district includes a "collection of late nineteenth and early twentieth-century Log and Rustic Tourist buildings located in the heart of Eldora, a small former mining town in western Boulder County, Colorado. The district consists primarily of dwellings constructed for its early mining population and later adapted for the vacationers who came on a seasonal basis. Additionally, the district contains several turn-of-the century vernacular Commercial Buildings from the mining era and a significant amount of open space, a distinctive component of the district's rural character."

A salient contributing building in the district is the Gold Miner Hotel, which is separately listed on the National Register.
