= Four Mile Creek Lattice =

- U.S. National Register of Historic Places
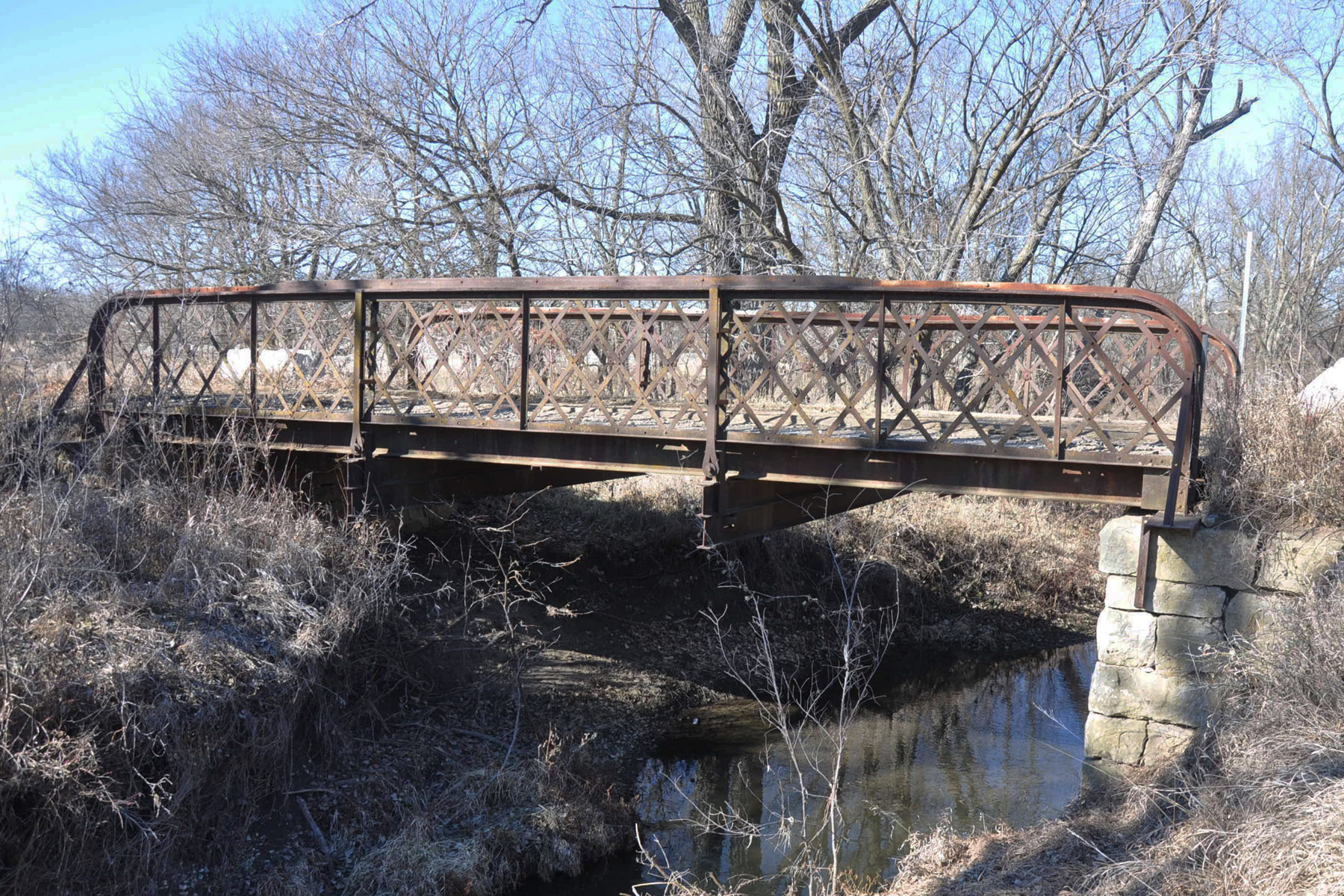

- Location within Kansas
- Nearest city: Wilsey, Kansas
- Coordinates: 38°36′33″N 96°39′21″W
- Area: less than one acre
- Built: c. 1890
- Architectural style: Lattice pony truss
- MPS: Metal Truss Bridges in Kansas 1861--1939 MPS
- NRHP reference No.: 89002181
- Added to NRHP: January 4, 1990

The Four Mile Creek Lattice is a historic bridge in rural Morris County, Kansas, located southeast of the community of Wilsey.

The bridge, which was built circa 1890, carries a county road across Four Mile Creek. The single-span steel bridge is 35 feet (11 m) long. It has a lattice truss design, which is typified by smaller diagonal beams that form a lattice pattern; the design is also an example of a pony truss, where the trusses are above the roadbed but not connected at the top. Ornamental iron sunflowers adorn the sides of the bridge. While the bridge's builder is not documented, the design is similar to those of the Canton Bridge Company of Canton, Ohio, which also built many other bridges in Kansas during the period.

The bridge was added to the National Register of Historic Places on January 4, 1990.
