= E. B. Teague =

American evangelist and educator

- Born: January 20, 1820; Newberry County, South Carolina
- Died: November 24, 1902 (aged 82); Abernant, Tuscaloosa County, Alabama
- Resting place: Columbiana, Alabama
- Education: University of Alabama
- Occupations: Baptist clergyman, Confederate States Army chaplain, and author

Eldred Burder "E. B." Teague (January 20, 1820 – November 24, 1902) was an Alabama Baptist minister and educational leader of the 19th century.

E. B. Teague was born in Newberry County, South Carolina on January 20, 1820. In 1822, his family moved to Greene County, Alabama, then to Shelby County, Alabama. He graduated from the University of Alabama on December 16, 1840, and received a Master of Arts three years later. He was awarded an honorary Doctorate of Divinity from Howard College in 1870.

On June 15, 1843, he married Sophia Nelson Blount, who was the daughter of James G. Blount (a former sheriff of Tuscaloosa County). Together they had six children. After Sophia's death, he married Louise Emeline Philpot in June 1861 in Tuskegee, Alabama. This marriage produced ten children.

He was a teacher for six years in Montgomery County, and became an ordained minister in 1844. He preached at various churches in Alabama for ten years before preaching at a church in LaGrange, Georgia for ten years. For three years, he was the president of East Alabama Female College in Tuskegee, before returning to active ministry. During his role as a preacher, he served churches in Selma, Columbiana, Montevallo, Fayetteville, Jefferson County, Greene County, Alabama, and LaGrange, Georgia. He retired from preaching in 1896, after serving as pastor in Columbiana for a second time. He also organized the Baptist church in Wilsonville, Alabama. While preaching in Shelby County and the surrounding area, Teague lived on his farm in the Fourmile community, which he named Red Lawn.

E. B. Teague played an important role in the Alabama Baptist Convention. In 1873, he became one of the editors of The Alabama Baptist. In 1886, he introduced a successful resolution at the state convention meeting to move Howard College from Marion to Birmingham He also authored two books: "Sketches of the History of Shelby County," and "An Outline Picture of the Baptist denomination in Alabama in former times and incidentally in other states; consisting of sketches, pastoral and ministerial experience, and various miscellanies," (which is deposited in the Southern Baptist Theological Seminary archives).

During the American Civil War, he served with the Army of Tennessee from the Chattanooga campaign until General John Bell Hood's expedition into Georgia.

E. B. Teague died on November 24, 1902, in Abernant, Alabama, and is buried in the Columbiana Cemetery in Columbiana, Alabama.
