= Fourmile Lake =

Fourmile Lake or Four Mile Lake may refer to:

- Four Mile Lake (Ontario), Canada
- Fourmile Lake, Michigan, an unincorporated community
- Fourmile Lake (Minnesota), US
- Fourmile Lake (Oregon), US
- Fourmile Lake (South Dakota), US
