= Four Mile Cliff =

Antarctic clif

Four Mile Cliff (77°11′58″S 162°27′05″E) is a rock cliff, 4 nautical miles (7.4 km) long, that flanks the southern side of Debenham Glacier north of Mount Bevilacqua. The cliff rises 150 metres (490 ft) above the glacier and 600 metres (2,000 ft) above sea level. A descriptive name was applied by the Advisory Committee on Antarctic Names in 2007.
