= Four Mile, West Virginia =

Unincorporated community in West Virginia, United States

Four Mile
- Unincorporated community
- Location within the state of West Virginia Four Mile (the United States)
- Coordinates: 39°35′13″N 80°37′3″W
- Country: United States
- State: West Virginia
- County: Wetzel
- Elevation: 797 ft (243 m)
- Time zone: UTC-5 (Eastern (EST))
  - Summer (DST): UTC-4 (EDT)
- GNIS ID: 1539174

Four Mile is an unincorporated community in Wetzel County, West Virginia, United States.
