= Fourmile Creek (Neosho River tributary) =

Stream in Kansas, United States

- Location within Kansas Location within the United States

Physical characteristics
- Source
  - coordinates: 38.6363976°N 96.7058418°W
- Mouth
  - coordinates: 38.6205643°N 96.4563911°W

Fourmile Creek is a stream in the U.S. state of Kansas. It is a tributary to the Neosho River.

Fourmile Creek was so named on account of its distance, 4 miles (6.4 km) miles from Council Grove. The Four Mile Creek Lattice bridge is listed on the National Register of Historic Places.
