= Fourmile Creek (Moreau River tributary) =

Stream in South Dakota, U.S.

Coordinates: 45°04′53″N 103°31′37″W

Fourmile Creek is a stream in the U.S. state of South Dakota. It is a tributary of Moreau River.

Fourmile Creek received its name from its distance, 4 miles (6.4 km) from a pioneer trail.

== See also ==
- List of rivers of South Dakota
