= Fourmile Creek (Chaffee County, Colorado) =

Tributary of the Arkansas River

Fourmile Creek is a tributary of the Arkansas River in Chaffee County, Colorado. The confluence with the Arkansas River is at just north of Buena Vista, Colorado.

== See also ==
- List of rivers of Colorado
