= Columbiana, Alabama =

City in and county seat of Shelby County, Alabama

- City
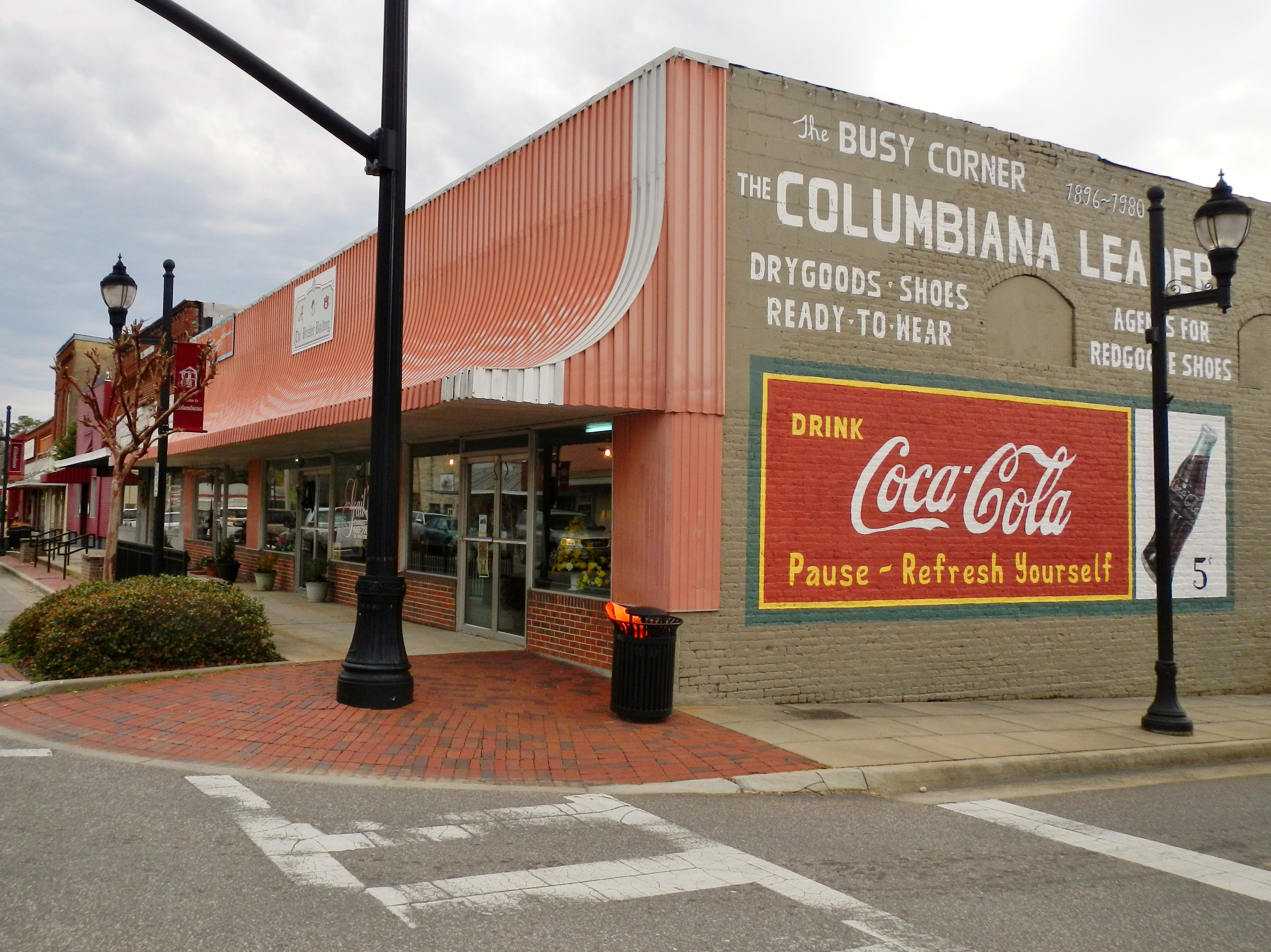
- Columbiana, Alabama

- Flag Seal Logo
- Motto: "Embracing The Future, While Preserving The Past”
- Location of Columbiana in Shelby County, Alabama.
- Coordinates: 33°10′39″N 86°38′20″W
- Country: United States
- State: Alabama
- County: Shelby

Area
  - Total: 17.40 sq mi (45.07 km^{2})
  - Land: 17.30 sq mi (44.81 km^{2})
  - Water: 0.10 sq mi (0.26 km^{2})
- Elevation: 558 ft (170 m)

Population (2020)
  - Total: 4,462
  - Density: 257.9/sq mi (99.57/km^{2})
- Time zone: UTC-6 (Central (CST))
  - Summer (DST): UTC-5 (CDT)
- ZIP code: 35051
- Area codes: 205, 659
- FIPS code: 01-16768
- GNIS feature ID: 2404109
- Website: www.cityofcolumbiana.com

Columbiana is a city and the county seat of Shelby County, Alabama, United States. At the 2020 census, the population was 4,462.

== History ==
Columbiana, originally called Columbia, was selected as the county seat of Shelby County in 1826 over rivals Calera and Montevallo. After the selection as the county seat, Columbiana celebrated by drilling holes in a large pine tree and packing it with gunpowder. The tree was blown up and the sound could be heard for miles. Later in 1826, the courthouse was moved to an old school building in Columbiana.

An act of the Alabama Legislature officially changed the name of Shelby County's county seat to Columbiana on January 13, 1832. Columbiana was incorporated on December 5, 1837, with corporate limits one-quarter of a mile in each direction from the public square.

In 1854, the decision was made to build a larger courthouse at the south end of “Silk Stocking Road”, now Main Street. From 1854 to 1908 several additions and changes were made to the courthouse. During the American Civil War, Columbiana was connected to the nearby town of Shelby by the Shelby Iron Company Railroad, which connected the Shelby Iron Works to the Alabama and Tennessee River Railroad. The Iron Works supplied iron to the C.B. Churchill and Company foundry, which moved to Columbiana in 1862 after the fall of Corinth, Mississippi. The Churchill foundry made eight and ten pound shot, eight and ten pound shells, and shells for Blakely rifles. The C.B. Churchill and Company foundry, Shelby Iron Works and the railroad were destroyed by Union forces on March 31, 1865, as part of Wilson's Raid.

Moving the courthouse to Columbiana was not necessarily popular in 1826, and there have been numerous attempts to relocate the county seat over the years. In 1901, the Alabama Constitutional Convention addressed the issue by including Section 41 in the new state constitution. Section 41 prohibited a move of the Shelby County seat from Columbiana unless a vote of the people was held, the only county in Alabama with such a designation.

To further solidify Columbiana's claim to the county seat, in 1905 construction began two blocks north of the existing courthouse on a new marble courthouse at a cost of $300,000. The new courthouse was completed in 1908 and has been renovated and enlarged on a number of occasions. The new courthouse has served Shelby County for over 100 years.

The “Old Courthouse” is now home to the Shelby County Museum and Archives.

== Geography ==
The city is located in the southeastern part of the county along Alabama State Route 25, which runs northeast to southwest to the west of the downtown area, leading northeast 9 miles (14 km) to Wilsonville and southwest 11 miles (18 km) to Calera.

== City government ==
Columbiana is a municipal corporation organized under the laws of the State of Alabama. The city is 25 miles (40 km) southeast of Birmingham. According to the 2010 census conducted by the U.S. Department of Commerce, the population of Columbiana was 4,197. There are 16.86 square miles (43.7 km^{2}) within the corporate limits of Columbiana.

Columbiana is governed under the mayor-council form of government. The mayor is elected on an at-large basis for a four-year term and the five council members are elected from single member districts, each for a four-year term. The mayor and council serve on a part-time basis. The mayor serves as chief executive officer of the city and is responsible for the daily operations of all departments of the city. The council acts as the legislative branch of the city.

Municipal operations are financed largely by sales tax, utility revenues, privilege licenses, and property taxes.

=== Elected officials ===
- Mayor Lisa Davis
- District 1 Councilmember: Karen Lilly
- District 2 Councilmember: Vicki Mizzell
- District 3 Councilmember: Ricky Ruston
- District 4 Councilmember: Kim King
- District 5 Councilmember: Ashley Phillips

== Demographics ==
Historical population
Census	Pop.	Note	%±
1880	496		—
1890	654		31.9%
1900	1,075		64.4%
1910	1,079		0.4%
1920	1,073		−0.6%
1930	1,180		10.0%
1940	1,197		1.4%
1950	1,761		47.1%
1960	2,264		28.6%
1970	2,248		−0.7%
1980	2,655		18.1%
1990	2,968		11.8%
2000	3,316		11.7%
2010	4,197		26.6%
2020	4,462		6.3%
2025 (est.)	5,106	▲	14.4%
U.S. Decennial Census

=== Racial and ethnic composition ===
Columbiana city, Alabama – Racial and ethnic composition Note: the US Census treats Hispanic/Latino as an ethnic category. This table excludes Latinos from the racial categories and assigns them to a separate category. Hispanics/Latinos may be of any race.
Race / Ethnicity (NH = Non-Hispanic)	Pop 1980	Pop 1990	Pop 2000	Pop 2010	Pop 2020	% 1980	% 1990	% 2000	% 2010	% 2020
White alone (NH)	2,192	2,334	2,570	2,936	3,139	82.56%	78.64%	77.50%	69.95%	70.35%
Black or African American alone (NH)	446	613	647	1,055	1,003	16.80%	20.65%	19.51%	25.14%	22.48%
Native American or Alaska Native alone (NH)	2	6	8	5	3	0.08%	0.20%	0.24%	0.12%	0.07%
Asian alone (NH)	0	7	5	10	7	0.00%	0.24%	0.15%	0.24%	0.16%
Native Hawaiian or Pacific Islander alone (NH)	x	x	0	3	0	x	x	0.00%	0.07%	0.00%
Other race alone (NH)	0	0	1	7	16	0.00%	0.00%	0.03%	0.17%	0.36%
Mixed race or Multiracial (NH)	x	x	19	54	159	x	x	0.57%	1.29%	3.56%
Hispanic or Latino (any race)	15	8	66	127	135	0.56%	0.27%	1.99%	3.03%	3.03%
Total	2,655	2,968	3,316	4,197	4,462	100.00%	100.00%	100.00%	100.00%	100.00%

=== 2020 census ===
As of the 2020 census, Columbiana had a population of 4,462 and 851 families resided in the city. The median age was 40.0 years. 16.6% of residents were under the age of 18 and 16.5% of residents were 65 years of age or older. For every 100 females there were 123.7 males, and for every 100 females age 18 and over there were 125.6 males age 18 and over.

0.0% of residents lived in urban areas, while 100.0% lived in rural areas.

There were 1,332 households in Columbiana, of which 30.8% had children under the age of 18 living in them. Of all households, 43.3% were married-couple households, 13.4% were households with a male householder and no spouse or partner present, and 38.6% were households with a female householder and no spouse or partner present. About 29.6% of all households were made up of individuals and 16.7% had someone living alone who was 65 years of age or older.

There were 1,448 housing units, of which 8.0% were vacant. The homeowner vacancy rate was 0.7% and the rental vacancy rate was 7.7%.

=== 2010 census ===
At the 2010 census there were 4,197 people in 1,303 households, including 874 families, in the city. The population density was 218.2 inhabitants per square mile (84.2/km^{2}). There were 1,445 housing units at an average density of 95.1 per square mile (36.7/km^{2}). The racial makeup of the city was 71.3% White, 25.1% Black or African American, 0.3% Native American, 0.2% Asian, 0.1% Pacific Islander, 1.6% from other races, and 1.3% from two or more races. 3.0% of the population were Hispanic or Latino of any race. Of the 1,303 households 28.4% had children under the age of 18 living with them, 47.5% were married couples living together, 14.7% had a female householder with no husband present, and 32.9% were non-families. 29.7% of households were one person and 15.6% were one person aged 65 or older. The average household size was 2.52 and the average family size was 3.12.

The age distribution was 19.7% under the age of 18, 9.7% from 18 to 24, 32.2% from 25 to 44, 24.3% from 45 to 64, and 14.1% 65 or older. The median age was 37.8 years. For every 100 females, there were 121.1 males. For every 100 females age 18 and over, there were 148.9 males.

The median household income was $31,108 and the median family income was $56,411. Males had a median income of $43,304 versus $34,583 for females. The per capita income for the city was $21,003. About 11.0% of families and 16.2% of the population were below the poverty line, including 29.1% of those under age 18 and 9.2% of those age 65 or over.

=== 2000 census ===
At the 2000 census there were 3,316 people in 1,260 households, including 868 families, in the city. The population density was 218.5 inhabitants per square mile (84.4/km^{2}). There were 1,372 housing units at an average density of 90.4 per square mile (34.9/km^{2}). The racial makeup of the city was 78.59% White, 19.60% Black or African American, 0.24% Native American, 0.15% Asian, 0.03% Pacific Islander, 0.66% from other races, and 0.72% from two or more races. 1.99% of the population were Hispanic or Latino of any race. Of the 1,260 households 34.0% had children under the age of 18 living with them, 51.8% were married couples living together, 13.4% had a female householder with no husband present, and 31.1% were non-families. 29.2% of households were one person and 12.9% were one person aged 65 or older. The average household size was 2.50 and the average family size was 3.10.

The age distribution was 25.9% under the age of 18, 8.3% from 18 to 24, 31.6% from 25 to 44, 21.8% from 45 to 64, and 12.4% 65 or older. The median age was 36 years. For every 100 females, there were 100.5 males. For every 100 females age 18 and over, there were 93.2 males.

The median household income was $34,034 and the median family income was $44,798. Males had a median income of $34,350 versus $21,193 for females. The per capita income for the city was $18,086. About 8.2% of families and 11.5% of the population were below the poverty line, including 15.3% of those under age 18 and 14.2% of those age 65 or over.

== Education ==
Shelby County Schools operates public schools.

- Elvin Hill Elementary School – kindergarten through fifth grade
- Columbiana Middle School – sixth grade through eighth grade
- Shelby County High School – ninth grade through twelfth grade. The Shelby County Wildcats school colors are maroon and white. The colors were changed from its original school colors of red and white, which were also used by rival Thompson High. Its sports teams are part of the Alabama High School Athletic Association Class 5A.
- Shelby County School of Technology – career technical center
- Cornerstone Christian School – private school serving Pre-kindergarten through twelfth grade

== Notable people ==
- Robert J. Bentley (born February 3, 1943), Governor of Alabama (2011–2017).
- Leven H. Ellis (April 6, 1881 – January 4, 1968), Lt. Governor of Alabama 1943 to 1947.
- J. Frank Norris (1877–1952), Leader of Baptist Fundamentalism, lived in Columbiana during his youth
- E. B. Teague (1820–1902), prominent Baptist preacher
- Mary Ware, poet and prose writer

== Gallery ==
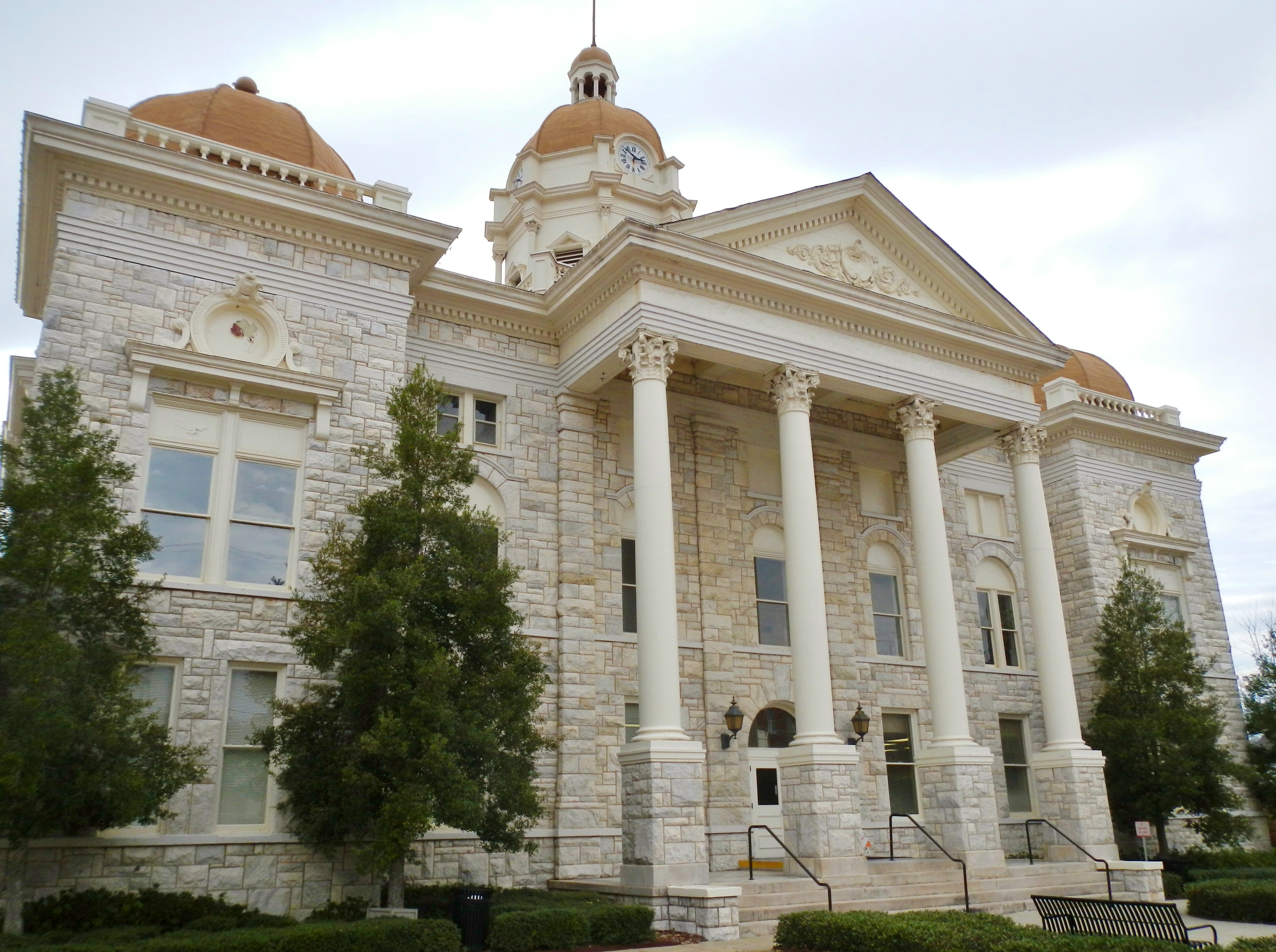
Shelby County Courthouse in Columbiana.

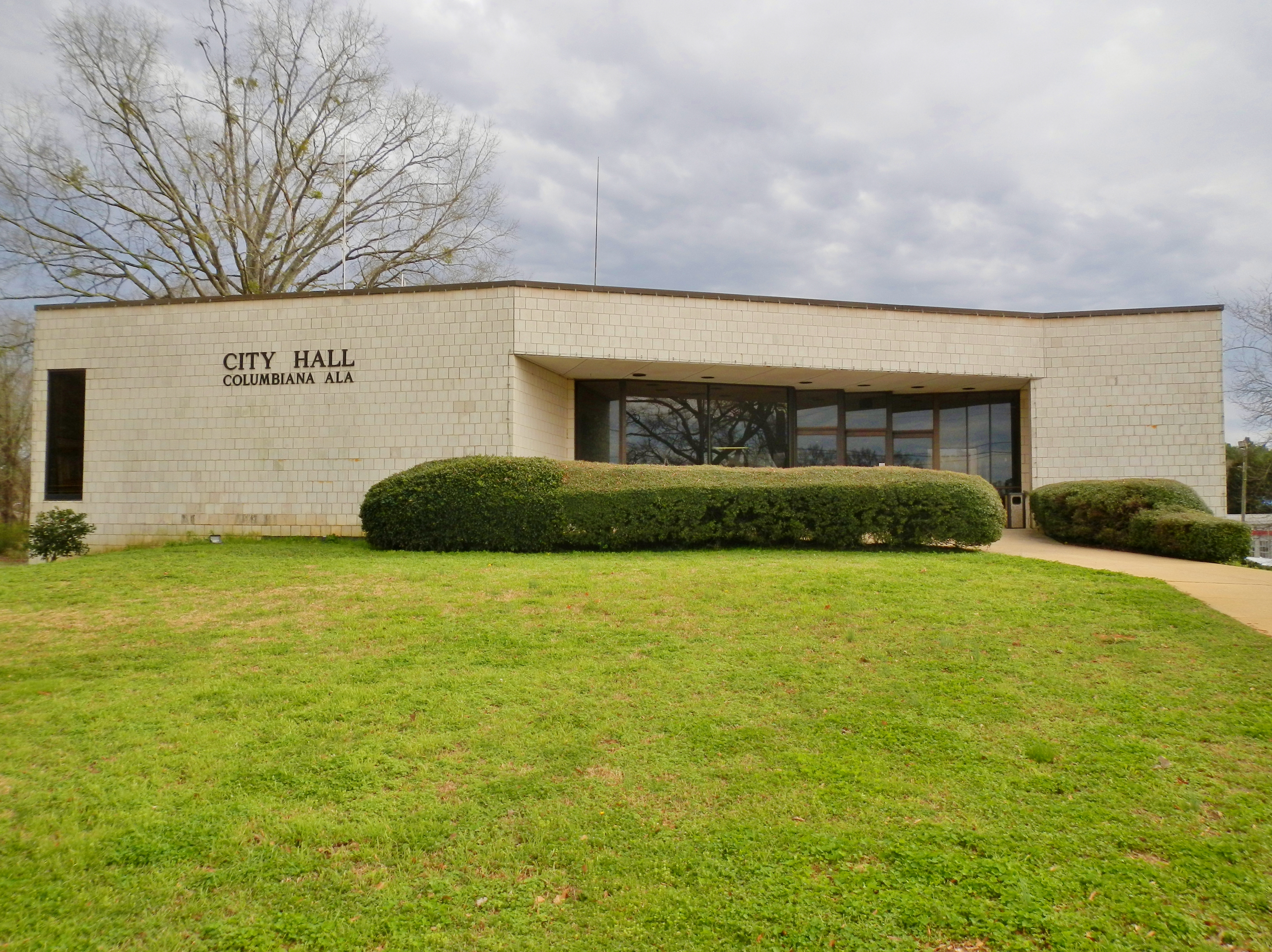
Columbiana City Hall

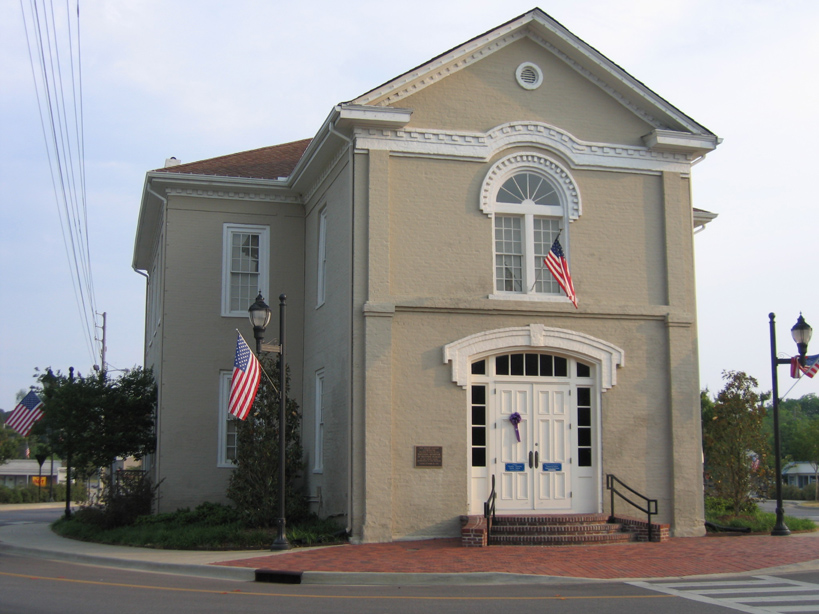
The Old Shelby County Courthouse is a defunct courthouse in Columbiana, Alabama. It was built in 1854 and added to the National Register of Historic Places on October 29, 1974.

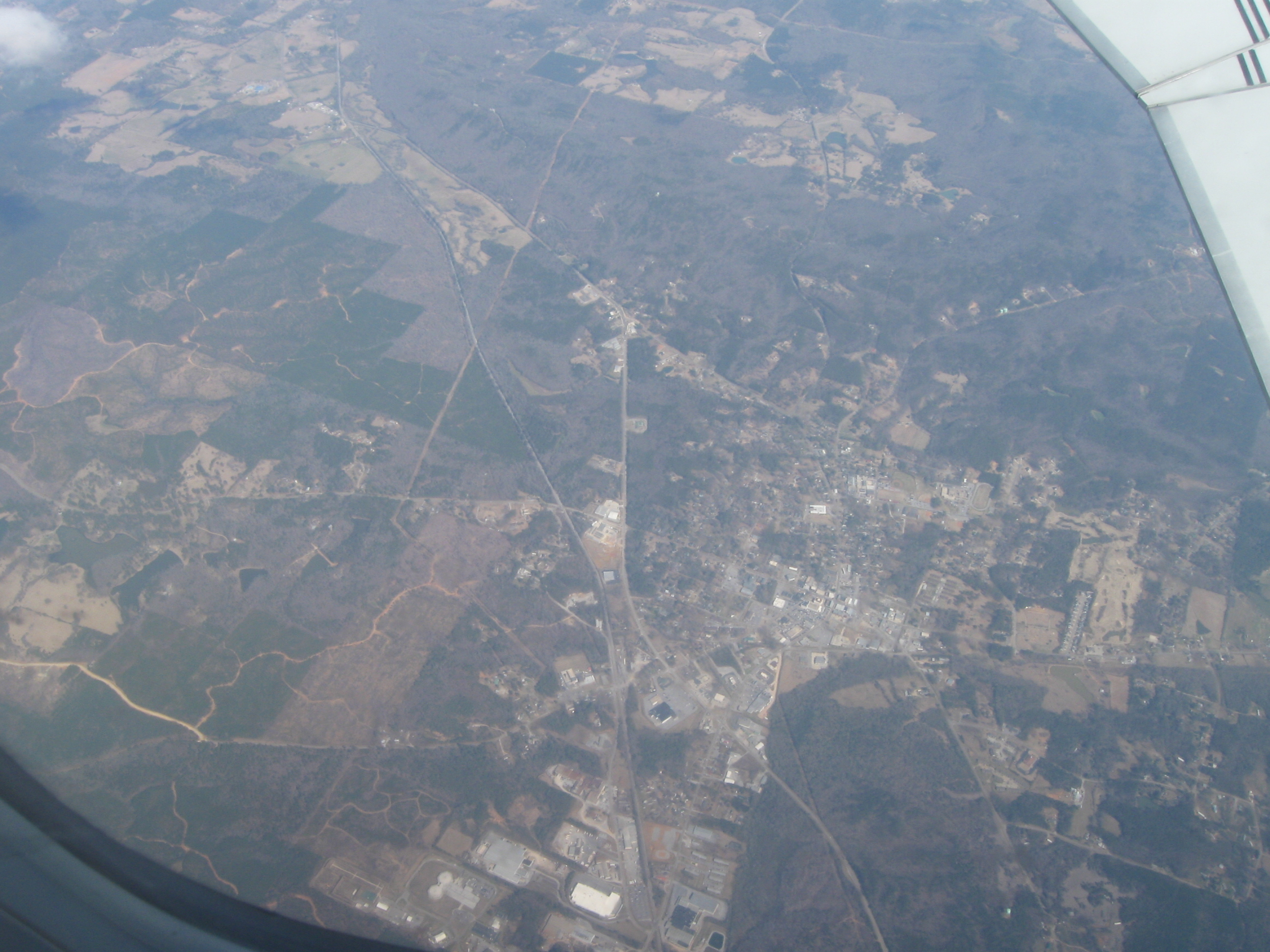
Aerial photograph of Columbiana and surrounding area.
