= Wilsonville, Alabama =

- Town
- Location of Wilsonville in Shelby County, Alabama.
- Coordinates: 33°14′50″N 86°29′25″W
- Country: United States
- State: Alabama
- County: Shelby

Area
  - Total: 10.86 sq mi (28.12 km^{2})
  - Land: 10.63 sq mi (27.54 km^{2})
  - Water: 0.22 sq mi (0.58 km^{2})
- Elevation: 433 ft (132 m)

Population (2020)
  - Total: 1,857
  - Density: 174.7/sq mi (67.44/km^{2})
- Time zone: UTC-6 (Central (CST))
  - Summer (DST): UTC-5 (CDT)
- ZIP code: 35186
- Area codes: 205, 659
- FIPS code: 01-82848
- GNIS feature ID: 2406894
- Website: www.wilsonvilleal.com

Wilsonville is a town in southeastern Shelby County, Alabama, United States, located northeast of Columbiana. At the 2020 census, the population was 1,857.

== History ==
Wilsonville is named after the earliest settler in the area, Elisha Wilson.

The town was incorporated in 1897. 3 years later in 1900, it had the distinction of being the largest community in Shelby County with 1,095, edging out the county seat of Columbiana by 20 people. It lost the distinction to Columbiana in 1910 and would not exceed its 1900 population again until 1990.

== Geography ==
Wilsonville is located in the southeastern part of Shelby County, with parts of its city limits extending east to the western shore of the Coosa River. Alabama State Route 25 is the main highway through the town, running northeast to southwest through the downtown area. Via AL 25, Harpersville is 9 mi (14 km) northeast, and Columbiana, the Shelby County seat, is 9 mi (14 km) southwest.

According to the U.S. Census Bureau, the town has a total area of 11.0 square miles (28 km^{2}), of which 9.9 square miles (26 km^{2}) is land and 1.1 square miles (2.8 km^{2}) (10.21%) is water.

== Demographics ==
Historical population
Census	Pop.	Note	%±
1880	93		—
1900	1,095		—
1910	933		−14.8%
1920	815		−12.6%
1930	770		−5.5%
1940	749		−2.7%
1950	692		−7.6%
1960	683		−1.3%
1970	659		−3.5%
1980	914		38.7%
1990	1,185		29.6%
2000	1,551		30.9%
2010	1,827		17.8%
2020	1,857		1.6%
U.S. Decennial Census; 2013 Estimate

=== Racial and ethnic composition ===
Wilsonville town, Alabama – Racial and ethnic composition Note: the US Census treats Hispanic/Latino as an ethnic category. This table excludes Latinos from the racial categories and assigns them to a separate category. Hispanics/Latinos may be of any race.
Race / Ethnicity (NH = Non-Hispanic)	Pop 2000	Pop 2010	Pop 2020	% 2000	% 2010	% 2020
White alone (NH)	1,432	1,620	1,614	92.33%	88.67%	86.91%
Black or African American alone (NH)	80	129	85	5.16%	7.06%	4.58%
Native American or Alaska Native alone (NH)	14	8	6	0.90%	0.44%	0.32%
Asian alone (NH)	12	1	8	0.77%	0.05%	0.43%
Native Hawaiian or Pacific Islander alone (NH)	0	0	0	0.00%	0.00%	0.00%
Other race alone (NH)	2	5	6	0.13%	0.27%	0.32%
Mixed race or Multiracial (NH)	2	17	83	0.13%	0.93%	4.47%
Hispanic or Latino (any race)	9	47	55	0.58%	2.57%	2.96%
Total	1,551	1,827	1,857	100.00%	100.00%	100.00%

=== 2020 census ===
As of the 2020 census, Wilsonville had a population of 1,857. The median age was 45.7 years. 20.1% of residents were under the age of 18 and 21.1% of residents were 65 years of age or older. For every 100 females there were 95.3 males, and for every 100 females age 18 and over there were 95.3 males age 18 and over.

0.0% of residents lived in urban areas, while 100.0% lived in rural areas.

There were 726 households and 603 families in Wilsonville, of which 29.1% had children under the age of 18 living in them. Of all households, 59.0% were married-couple households, 16.3% were households with a male householder and no spouse or partner present, and 20.4% were households with a female householder and no spouse or partner present. About 21.0% of all households were made up of individuals and 11.5% had someone living alone who was 65 years of age or older.

There were 828 housing units, of which 12.3% were vacant. The homeowner vacancy rate was 3.2% and the rental vacancy rate was 13.8%.

=== 2010 census ===
At the time of the census of 2010, there were 1,867 people, 610 households, and 486 families residing in the town. The population density was 157.5 inhabitants per square mile (60.8/km^{2}). There were 699 housing units at an average density of 71.0 per square mile (27.4/km^{2}). The racial makeup of the town was 92.52% White, 5.22% Black or African American, 0.90% Native American, 0.77% Asian, 0.26% from other races, and 0.32% from two or more races. 0.58% of the population were Hispanic or Latino of any race.

There were 610 households, out of which 31.3% had children under the age of 18 living with them, 66.9% were married couples living together, 8.5% had a female householder with no husband present, and 20.3% were non-families. 18.2% of all households were made up of individuals, and 8.7% had someone living alone who was 65 years of age or older. The average household size was 2.54 and the average family size was 2.84.

In the town, the population was spread out, with 23.5% under the age of 18, 6.0% from 18 to 24, 27.9% from 25 to 44, 26.6% from 45 to 64, and 16.0% who were 65 years of age or older. The median age was 41 years. For every 100 females, there were 97.1 males. For every 100 females age 18 and over, there were 94.7 males.

The median income for a household in the town was $42,105, and the median income for a family was $48,409. Males had a median income of $40,263 versus $25,598 for females. The per capita income for the town was $21,112. About 4.5% of families and 7.4% of the population were below the poverty line, including 7.8% of those under age 18 and 5.8% of those age 65 or over.

== Notable people ==
- Laurie C. Battle, U.S. Representative from Alabama
- Howard Hill. world-famous archer and stunt archer for Errol Flynn in The Adventures of Robin Hood.
- E. B. Teague, prominent Alabama Baptist minister of the 19th century; helped organize Wilsonville Baptist Church in 1879.
