= Fourmile Creek (Belle Fourche River tributary) =

Stream in South Dakota, U.S.

Coordinates: 44°29′04″N 103°06′06″W

Fourmile Creek is a stream in the U.S. state of South Dakota. It is a tributary of the Belle Fourche River.

Fourmile Creek received its name from its distance 4 miles (6.4 km) from a pioneer trail.

== See also ==
- List of rivers of South Dakota
