= Fourmile Canyon =

Canyon in Colorado, United States

Fourmile Canyon fire
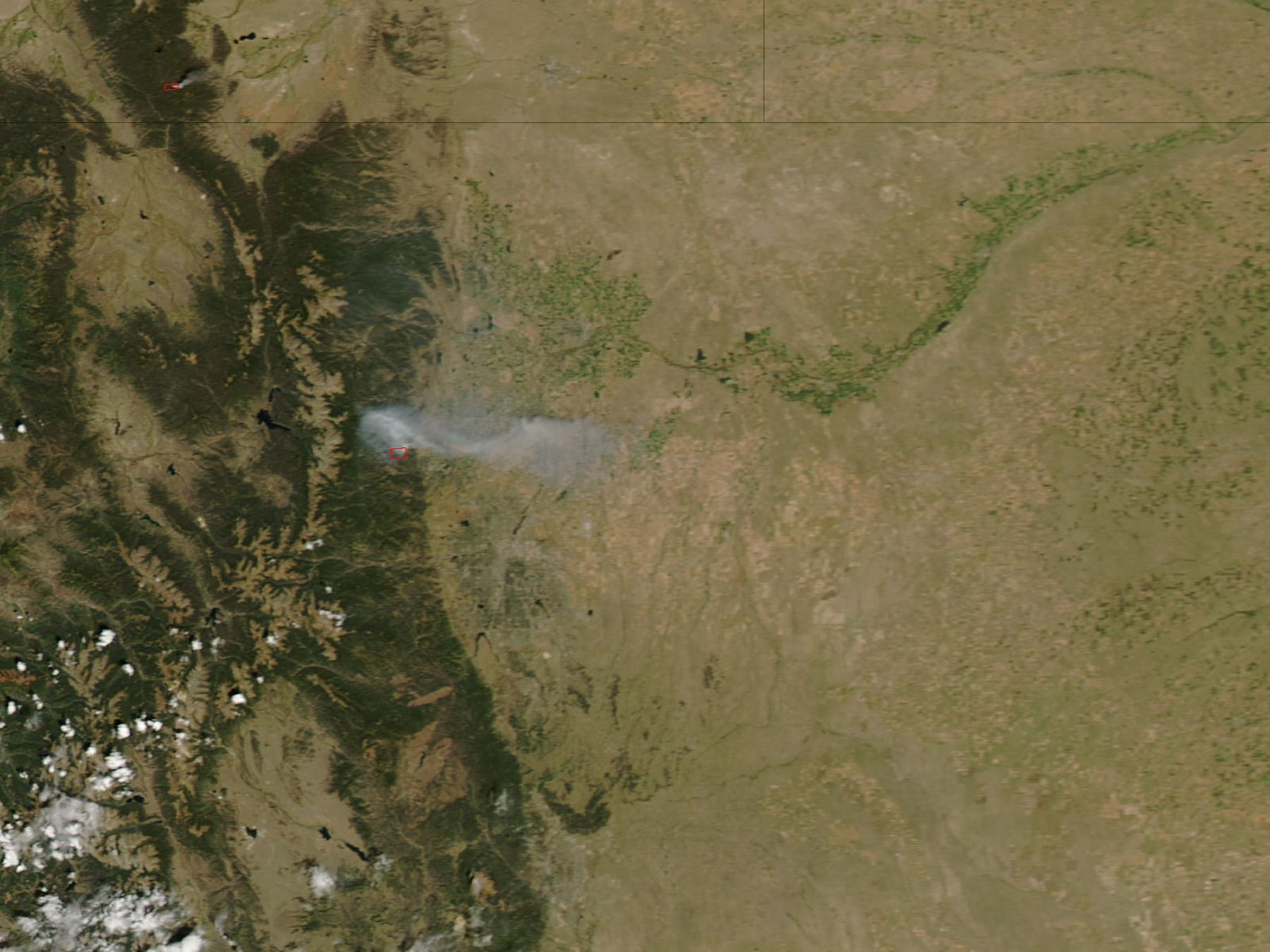
- The Fourmile Canyon Fire continued to burn on September 7, 2010, visible from NASA's Aqua satellite.
- Date: September 6, 2010 — September 16, 2010
- Coordinates: 40.048°N 105.39°W

Map
- Location within Colorado

Fourmile Canyon or Four Mile Canyon is a mountainous canyon in western Boulder County, Colorado that channels a stream known as Fourmile Creek or Four Mile Creek (this is not Fourmile Canyon Creek which runs a few miles north of Fourmile Creek).). The stream rises at 40.048°N 105.550°W on the southern slope of Niwot Mountain, before flowing east and south through the unincorporated communities of Sunset, Wallstreet, Salina and Crisman to the confluence with Boulder Creek at 40.015°N 105.324°W in Boulder Canyon, four miles west of the historic location of the Boulder Railroad Depot.

The canyon and surrounding area were the site of an eponymous major wildfire in September 2010.

== Early history ==
In 1859, gold was discovered in the Fourmile Canyon area, leading to early settlement. The 1872 discovery of tellurium reinvigorated local mining communities.

Fourmile Canyon was the location of the first narrow-gauge railroad to connect Union Pacific's standard-gauge network to the mines and mountain communities near Ward, and was the entryway to the Switzerland Trail tourist route that wound through the mountains between Nederland and Ward. The Fourmile narrow gauge track was active from the 1880s until 1919.

== 2010 wildfire ==
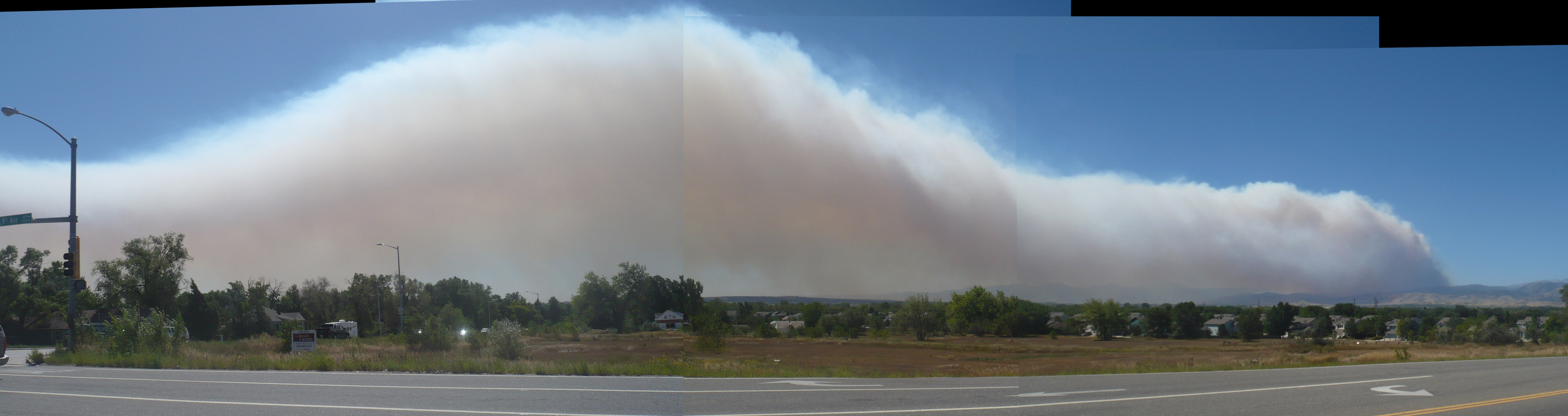
Fourmile Canyon fire smoke plume as seen from Longmont, Colorado on Monday, September 6.

=== Timeline ===
==== Day One: Monday, September 6, 2010 ====
An improperly extinguished fire pit reignited at approx. 10:00 a.m. on the property of a volunteer firefighter, who had been burning brush in the pit a few days earlier. Within minutes, a wildfire started consuming the canyon forest near Emerson Gulch. Winds of 15 mph with gusts to 41 mph, combined with very low humidity of 7 percent and decreasing, enabled 20 to 50 feet (15 m) high flames to spread quickly.

Multiple Fire Protection Districts responded to the area, as well as units from the Colorado State Forest Service, U.S. Forest Service, Boulder County, and the City of Boulder. Residents were evacuated and all roads into the fire zone were closed. At Rocky Mountain Metropolitan Airport in Broomfield, two aircraft tankers each with 2,000 gallons of fire retardant took off at 5:20 p.m., beginning a multi-day aerial firefighting campaign. Winds eased in the late afternoon, making it possible for the airplanes to drop the retardant on the periphery of the fire zone in an attempt to contain the flames. Smoke was visible across the entire Front Range northwest of Boulder.

By the end of September 6, the fire had burned approximately 5,733 acres — 93 percent of the total burn area.

==== Day Two: Tuesday, September 7, 2010 ====
The fire increased by only 375 acres on September 7, bringing the total burn size to 6,108 acres.

Colorado's governor, Bill Ritter, declared a state of emergency and dedicated $5 million to help the effort. 3,500 people had been evacuated and 200 firefighters from more than 35 agencies had responded. More than 92 homes had been reported destroyed by the end of the second night. Nine of the destroyed homes belonged to firefighters who were fighting the fire.

An accident involving a propane tank was reported to have started the fire, but that was later determined to be hearsay.

==== Day Three: Wednesday, September 8, 2010 ====
Higher relative humidity and cooler temperatures allowed firefighters to build additional fire control lines and strengthen existing ones. Fire size remained at 6,108 acres.

Earlier in the day 20 people in the area were reported missing; by night fall the number had fallen to 5. The number of homes reported destroyed went up to 150, making it the second worst wildfire in Colorado history at the time.

==== Day Four: Thursday, September 9, 2010 ====
The number of firefighters grew to 430. All persons reported missing had been accounted for. At 10 a.m. some residents of the affected area were allowed to return to their homes, but were forced to move back out at 2 p.m. due to high winds. Boulder County estimated the number of homes burned at 169.

By 3 p.m., sustained winds of 40 miles per hour with gusts up to 64 mph were reported and relative humidity dropped below 30 percent. These conditions caused surface fuels and trees that had not previously burned within the interior of the fire to ignite. End-of-day infrared mapping calculated the fire size at 6,131 acres.

==== Day Five: Friday, September 10, 2010 ====
Firefighters continued to fight the blaze. In spite of low humidity and wind gusts in the mid to high 20s (mph), no significant fire growth occurred and infrared mapping recorded the final fire size at 6,181 acres burned.

==== Days Six through Eleven: Saturday, September 11, to Friday, September 17, 2010 ====
Although dry air and strong winds continued, the fire did not increase in size after September 10. The fire was declared 100% contained on September 13, and crews shifted their attention to locating and extinguishing hot spots until September 17.

"The Boulder County Sheriff's Office has lifted evacuation orders on all subdivisions within the fire perimeter. The fire area is open to residents only. Utilities and public works continue to repair damage to infrastructure. Residents are reminded to use caution within the fire area due to the heavy fire and utility traffic in the fire area."

A grand total of 6,181 acres (approximately 10 square miles) burned during the Fourmile Fire. The final burned acreage was lower than what was reported during the fire as a result of better GPS mapping.

=== Aftermath and Long-Term Impact ===
Of the 474 homes inside or within 100 feet of the final wildfire perimeter, 168 (35%) were destroyed. The number of homes destroyed was the most by any wildfire in Colorado history until that total was surpassed by the High Park fire in June 2012 and then by the Waldo Canyon fire later in June 2012.

Insurance claims for the fire totaled an estimated $217 million, making it the most expensive wildfire in Colorado history, as measured by insurance claims, to 2010. Total fire management costs (suppression, emergency management, and post-fire rehabilitation) are estimated at $14.1 million.
