= Fourmile Creek (Wood County, Wisconsin) =

Stream in Wisconsin, U.S.

Coordinates: 44°20′51″N 89°48′04″W

Fourmile Creek is a stream in the U.S. state of Wisconsin.

Fourmile Creek was so named for its distance, four miles (6.4 km) from the original Grand Rapids townsite. The name sometimes is spelled out "Four Mile Creek".
