= Fourmile Lake (Minnesota) =

Lake in the state of Minnesota, United States

- Location within Minnesota
- Location: Grant County, Minnesota
- Coordinates: 46°4′52″N 95°59′7″W
- Type: lake

Fourmile Lake is a lake in Grant County, in the U.S. state of Minnesota.

Fourmile Lake was named from its distance, four miles (6.4 km) from Pomme de Terre station.

== See also ==
- List of lakes in Minnesota
