= Fourmile Canyon Creek =

Physical characteristics
- Source
  - location: Boulder County, Colorado
  - coordinates: 40°04′13″N 105°21′37″W
- Mouth
  - location: Confluence with Boulder Creek
  - coordinates: 40°02′16″N 105°12′35″W
  - elevation: 5,161 ft (1,573 m)

Basin features
- Progression: Boulder—St. Vrain; South Platte—Platte; Missouri—Mississippi

Fourmile Canyon Creek or Four Mile Canyon Creek is a tributary of Boulder Creek. Its source is northwest of Boulder, Colorado and flows through the northern part of the city for part of its length. It should not be confused with a similarly named stream that runs through Fourmile Canyon west of Boulder, which was the site of a major wildfire in 2010.

This stream rises west of the old mining settlement of Sunshine. It runs eastward through the foothills of the Front Range in Boulder County, Colorado, south of Left Hand Canyon and north of Sunshine Canyon. The creek exits the mountains to the plains near Lee Hill Road in northern Boulder, then flows east an additional 5 mi (8.0 km) through the plains to its confluence with Boulder Creek near Valmont.

This stream is home to Boulder Open Space land, a trailhead, and the Anne U. White Trail. Although Fourmile Canyon Creek is a seasonal intermittent stream in the plains, it is also the target of flash flood prevention efforts.

== See also ==
- List of rivers of Colorado
