= Eldora, Colorado =

Census-designated place in Boulder County, Colorado, United States

- census-designated place
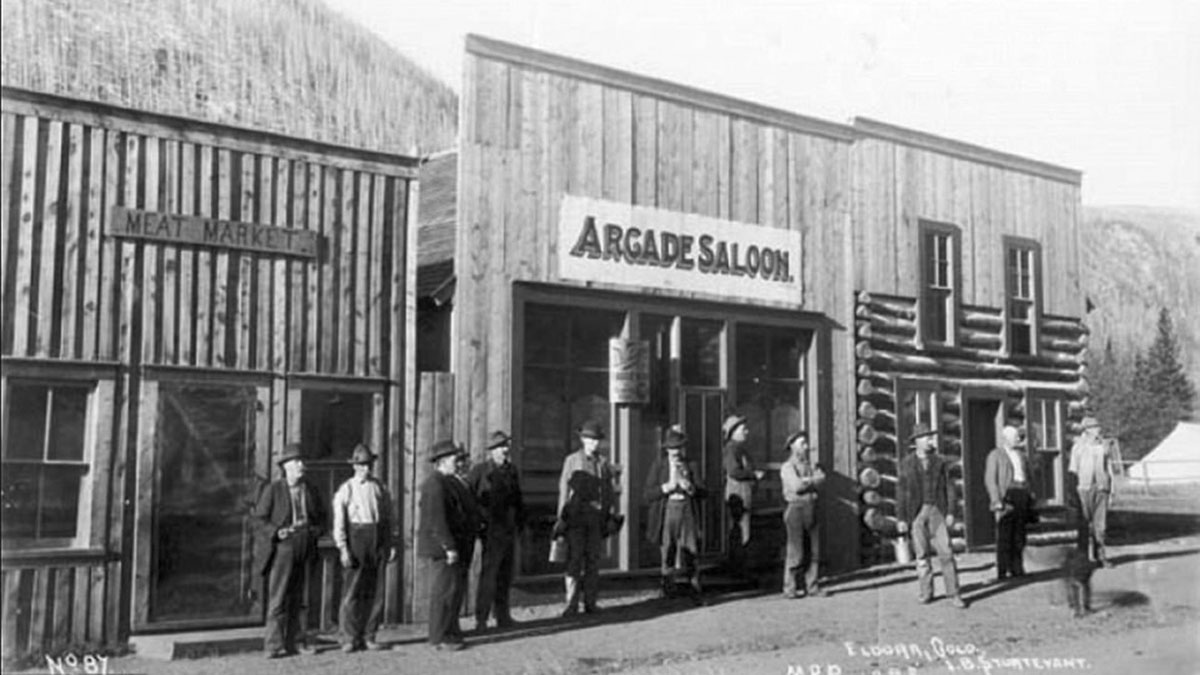
- The Arcade Saloon in 1898 Eldora Colorado.
- Nickname: Happy Valley
- Location of the Eldora CDP in Boulder County, Colorado
- Coordinates: 39°57′13″N 105°34′41″W
- Country: United States
- State: Colorado
- County: Boulder

Government
  - Type: unincorporated community
  - Body: Boulder County

Area
  - Total: 4.180 sq mi (10.827 km^{2})
  - Land: 4.156 sq mi (10.763 km^{2})
  - Water: 0.025 sq mi (0.064 km^{2})
- Elevation: 9,413 ft (2,869 m)

Population (2020)
  - Total: 140
  - Density: 34/sq mi (13/km^{2})
- Time zone: UTC−07:00 (MST)
  - Summer (DST): UTC−06:00 (MDT)
- ZIP code: Nederland 80466
- Area codes: 303/720/983
- GNIS CDP ID: 2408069
- FIPS code: 08-23575

Eldora (pronounced el-DOH-ruh), previously known as "Eldorado" then "El-Dora", then Eldora or Camp Eldorado, and still called Happy Valley, is an unincorporated community and a census-designated place (CDP) located in and governed by Boulder County, Colorado, United States. The CDP is a part of the Boulder, CO Metropolitan Statistical Area. The population of the Eldora CDP was 140 at the United States Census 2020. The Nederland post office (Zip Code 80466) serves the area.

Eldora is located within the Roosevelt National Forest, and is primarily an alpine, densely forested, and densely but smally populated area. Eldora is tucked into the valley carved by glaciation during the last ice age and by Middle Boulder Creek. From the village there are no views up toward the alpine ski runs of Eldora Mountain Resort. A one-time gold camp, Eldora was a shipping point for the Caribou silver mine in nearby Nederland, CO. At present, Eldora is characterized by small cabins, a sprinkling of vacation homes, and two long-shuttered mercantiles.

Points of interest near Eldora include the Eldora Mountain Resort, Eldora Historic District, and Indian Peaks Wilderness. Eldora Historic District has been listed on the U.S. National Register of Historic Places since 1989. The area is home to an abundance of wilderness and wildlife, including animals such as mountain lions, black bears, coyotes, red foxes, mule deer, elk, bobcats, and much more.

Eldora receives a heavy annual snowfall of 300 inches each winter.

== Etymology ==
Eldora was originally named Happy Valley in the 1890s for the discovery of the Happy Valley Placer Mine by John J. Kemp and seven city associates. The town was soon renamed El Dorado, Eldorado or Eldorado Camp. But, as frequently happened at the time, the U.S. Postal Service mistakenly delivered their mail to towns by the same name in other U.S. states, particularly to El Dorado, CA, creating havoc by delaying payroll checks and important papers. Consequently, the U.S. Post Service changed the conflicting name by dropping the last syllable “do” from Colorado's Eldorado. That name change occurred in 1898, one year after the local post office was established (Feb. 13, 1897), which was in use until it closed in September 1977.

== History ==
Eldora was first settled by the Arapaho- and Ute people who used the area for hunting during summer. Eldora was originally built as a mining town. Although prospectors had been poking around in Eldora since the early 1850s, it was not until 1875 that enough gold was discovered to open a mine in Eldora. The primary decision to officially establish a town in the 1880s was in part an effort to open up further mining area, and in part an attempt at a through route into Middle Park and Western Colorado. Eldora boomed and prospered during the 1890s, and at one point, Eldora was home to as many as 1300–1500 people in the late 1890s. The Eldora, Colorado, post office operated from February 13, 1897, until May 19, 1967. The Nederland, Colorado, post office (ZIP code 80466) now serves the area.

In 1898, Eldora was home to a bank, a school, nine hair saloons and seven grocery stores. Although it had a mining life of its own, Eldora also served as a supply center for the camps beyond, and a rail-road shipping center for the camps in the nearby area. The first time the manager of the Bailey Chlorination Mill in Eldora, Mr. Bailey, neglected to pay his workers on time, angry employees promptly gathered at his house, smoked him out, and shot and killed Mr. Bailey. Despite its intensity of gold, silver and tungsten mining, Eldora's economic boom was brief. It peaked at the turn of the century, but experienced a devastating wildfire in 1899. With much of its timber lost, lumber that was vital to the mining construction was in short supply. The 21st century has experienced renewed interest in Eldora mining, with hopes of reopening the Mogul Tunnel Mine on Spencer Mountain.

== Geography ==
Eldora is a small village located in the southwestern parts of Boulder County, Colorado. Eldora is located within the Roosevelt National Forest, at the base of Ute Mountains in the Middle Boulder Creek valley. It is situated immediately above the Colorado banana belt. The nearest town is Nederland, Colorado, four miles east of Eldora. From Boulder, CO, you follow Colorado 119 through Boulder Canyon to Nederland, CO, and then head south-west into Eldora.

The Eldora CDP has an area of 2,675 acres (10.827 km^{2}), including 16 acres (0.064 km^{2}) of water.

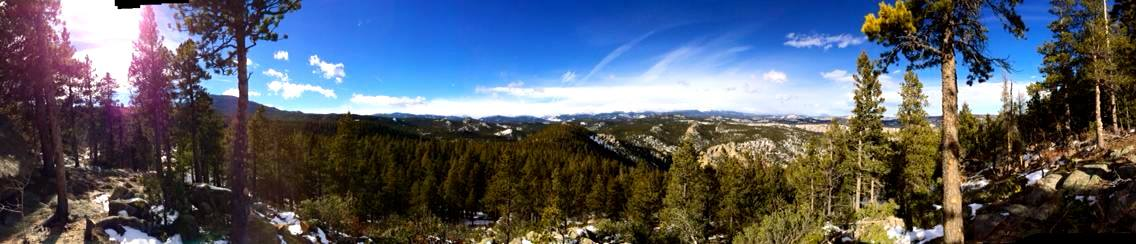
Panoramic view of the densely forested area of Eldora.

== Demographics ==
The United States Census Bureau initially defined the Eldora CDP for the United States Census 2000.

Eldora CDP, Colorado
Year	Pop.	±%
2000	170	—
2010	142	−16.5%
2020	140	−1.4%
Source: United States Census Bureau

== Attractions ==
- Eldora Mountain Resort
- Indian Peaks Wilderness
- Roosevelt National Forest

== Gallery ==
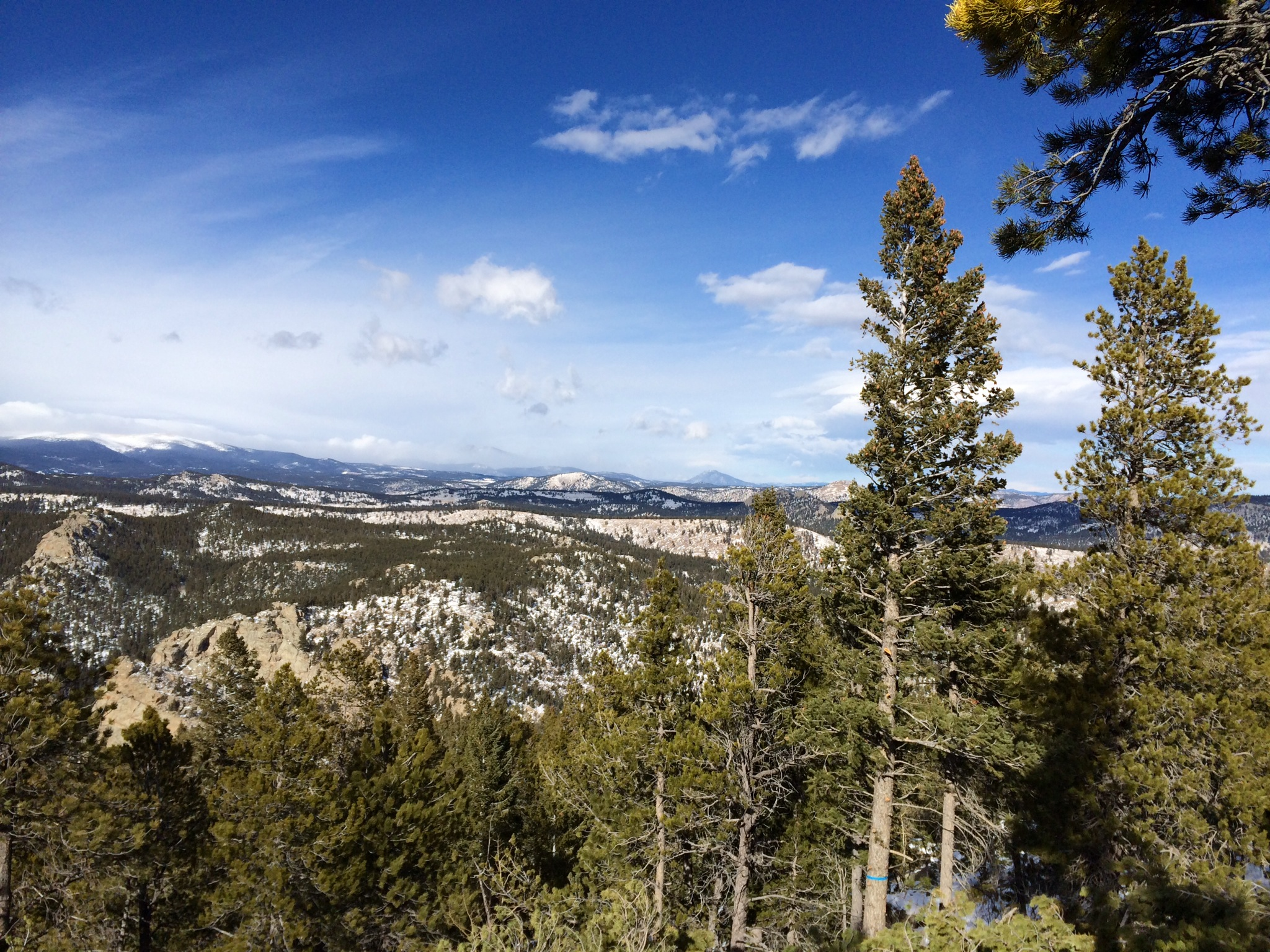
View of the densely forested areas surrounding Eldora Lodge at Wondervu.

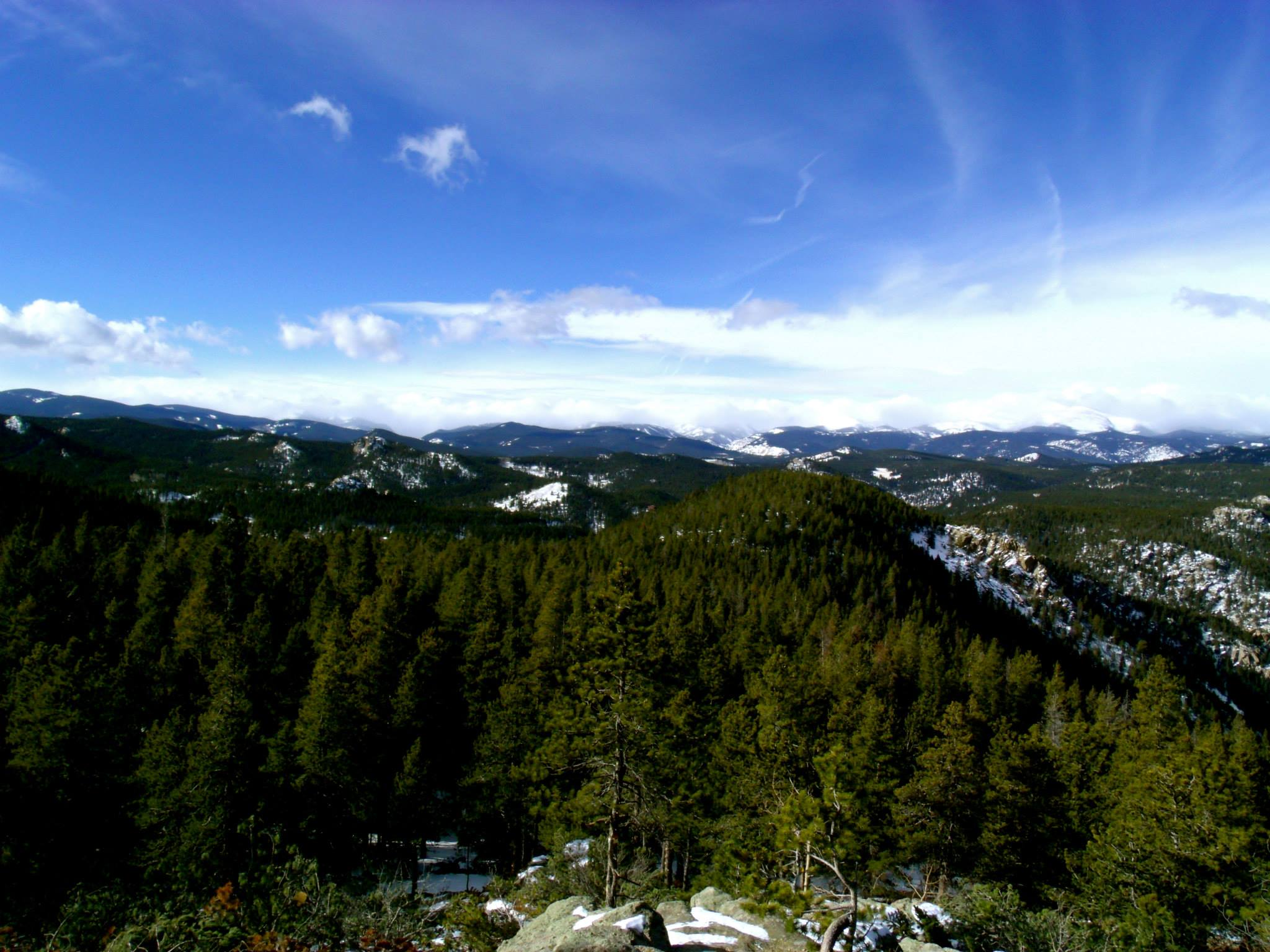
View of the densely forested and sparsely populated Eldora.

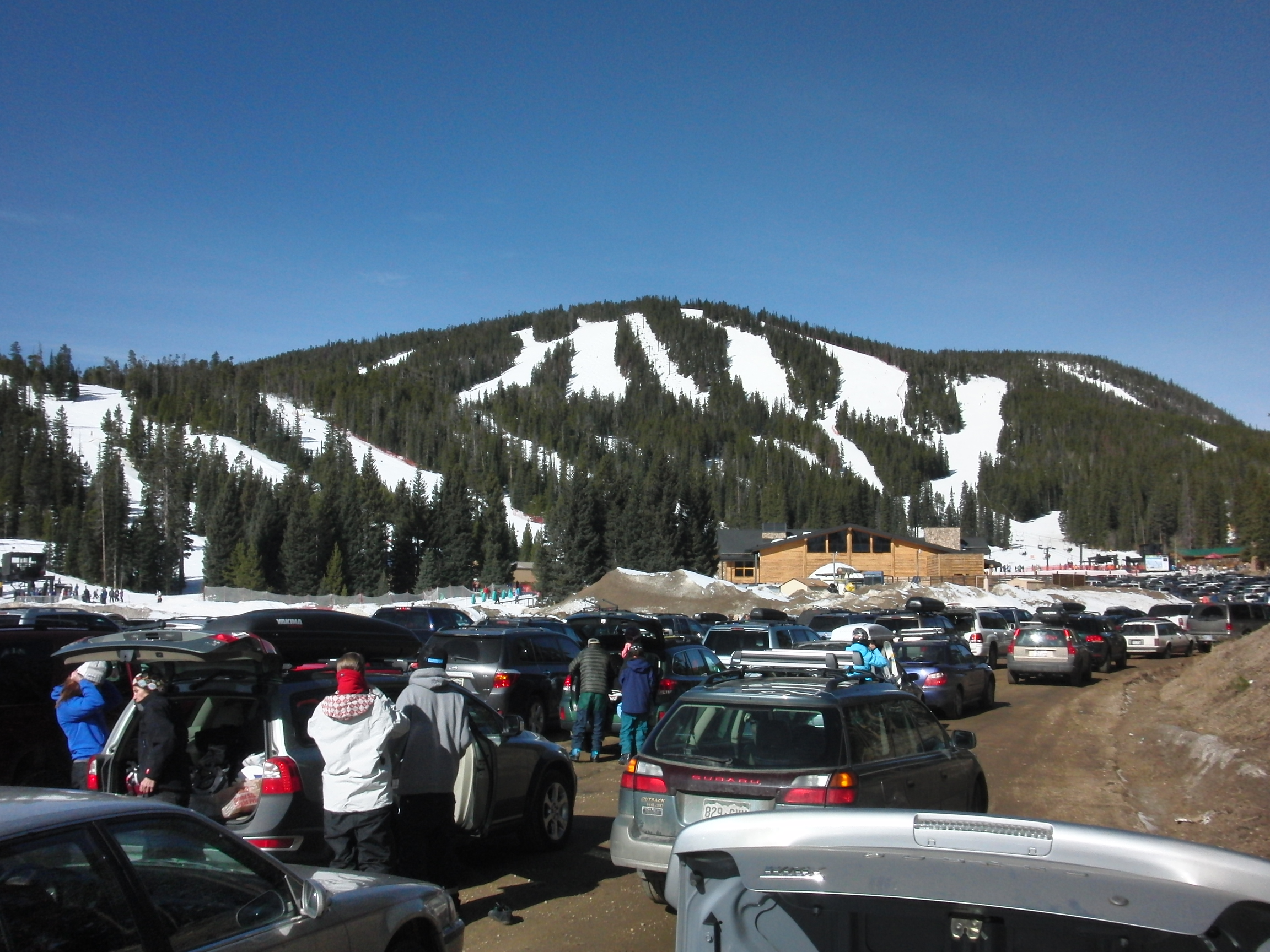
Eldora Mountain Resort and Challenge Mountain.

== See also ==
- Front Range Urban Corridor
