= Fourmile Creek (Des Moines River tributary) =

Stream in central Iowa, U.S.

Coordinates: 41°33′55″N 93°30′42″W

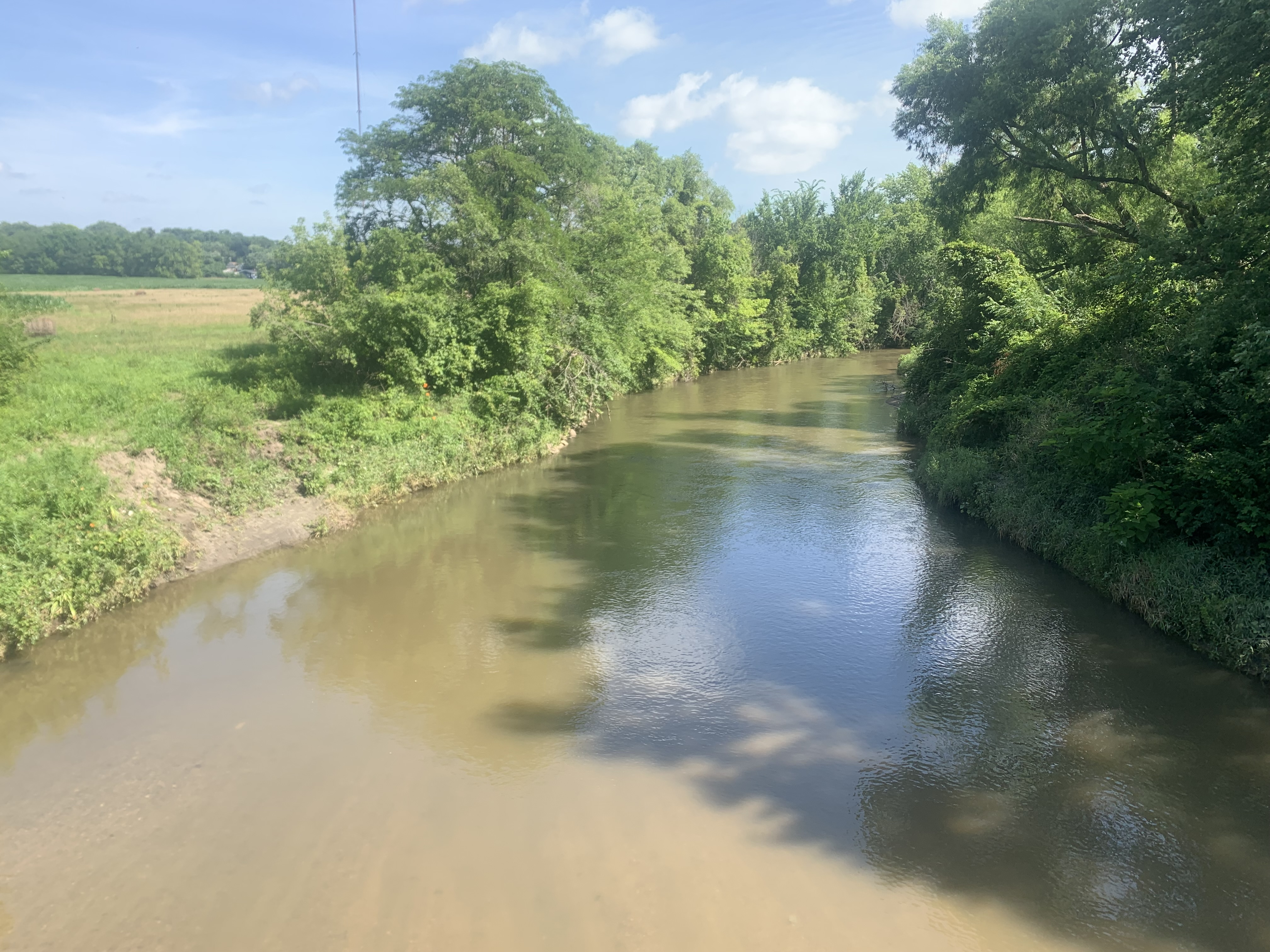
Fourmile Creek at Fairview Drive bridge in Pleasant Hill, Iowa

Fourmile Creek is a tributary stream of the Des Moines River that flows through Polk, Story and Boone counties, in the U.S. state of Iowa. Its watershed is the largest in Polk County and covers 76,600 acres (310 km^{2}) of which includes the cities and towns of Alleman, Altoona, Ankeny, Bondurant, Des Moines, Elkhart, Sheldahl, and Pleasant Hill. Fourmile Creek was so named from the fact a road crossing over it was 4 miles (6.4 km) from Des Moines.

== See also ==
- List of rivers of Iowa
