= Downtown Boulder Historic District =

Historic district in Colorado, United States

- U.S. National Register of Historic Places
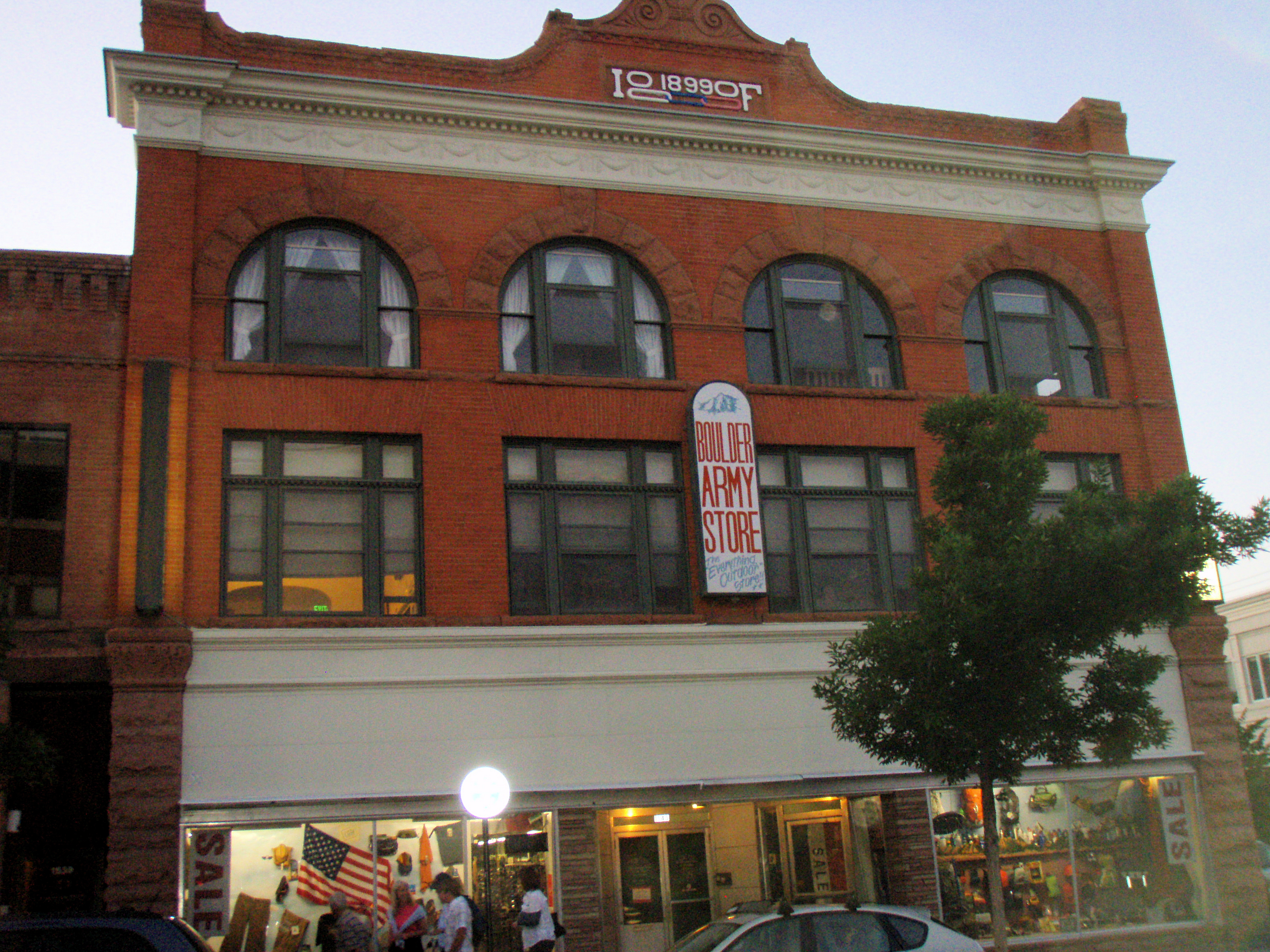
- IOOF building in 2009

- Location within Colorado
- Location: CO 19, Boulder, Colorado
- Coordinates: 40.01911°N 105.27478°W
- Area: 48 acres (19 ha)
- Built by: Multiple
- Architect: Multiple
- Architectural style: Classical Revival, Late Victorian
- NRHP reference No.: 80000878
- Added to NRHP: December 3, 1980

The Downtown Boulder Historic District, in Boulder, Colorado, is a 48 acres (19 ha) historic district which was listed on the National Register of Historic Places in 1980. Additional significance for the district was recognized in 2018 for association of the Boulder County Courthouse with events of 1975, when Boulder County clerk Clela Rorex issued marriage licenses to six same-sex couples.

It includes a surviving historic commercial area of Boulder, including Pearl Street between 9th and 16th Streets (part or all of what is now the Pearl Street Mall) and parts of Walnut, Spruce, and Pine Streets. It also includes the Boulder County Courthouse and the historic Boulderado Hotel.

The township of Boulder was created as a supply center for miners in the Pike's Peak Gold Rush in 1858–59. About 70 cabins were built along Pearl Street in 1859, all of which were eventually replaced by more substantial commercial and other structures.

In 1980 the district was deemed "significant because of its association with the evolution and development of business and commerce in the city which has long served as the economic center of the Boulder Valley and surrounding communities. The district is also significant for its architectural features which manifest the salient characteristics of late nineteenth/early twentieth century commercial design."

Then, the 168 properties in the district included "125 buildings that contribute to the historic and architectural integrity of the district, 21 more modern structures compatible with the older fabric," and several intrusions, parking structures, and empty lots. The National Register designation provided limited protection, however, and about 15 percent of the historic buildings were lost. In 1999 the district was designated a Boulder Historic District, providing further protection.

Selected contributing buildings include:

- Boulder County Courthouse
- IOOF Building
- Boulder Post Office, separately listed on the National Register
- Boulderado Hotel, separately listed on the National Register

In 2018, the historic district's official documentation was updated "to recognize an additional area of significance of Social History for the Boulder County Courthouse, as well as the district generally, for association with the first same-sex marriage licenses issued in Colorado and the civil rights struggles of Lesbian, Gay, Bisexual, Transgender and Queer (LGBTQ) people."

Guided walking tours of historic downtown Boulder are available in summer months.

== See also ==
- National Register of Historic Places listings in Boulder County, Colorado
