= William Redding & Son =

- Industry: Architecture
- Founders: William Redding; E. Floyd Redding
- Headquarters: Denver, Colorado, United States

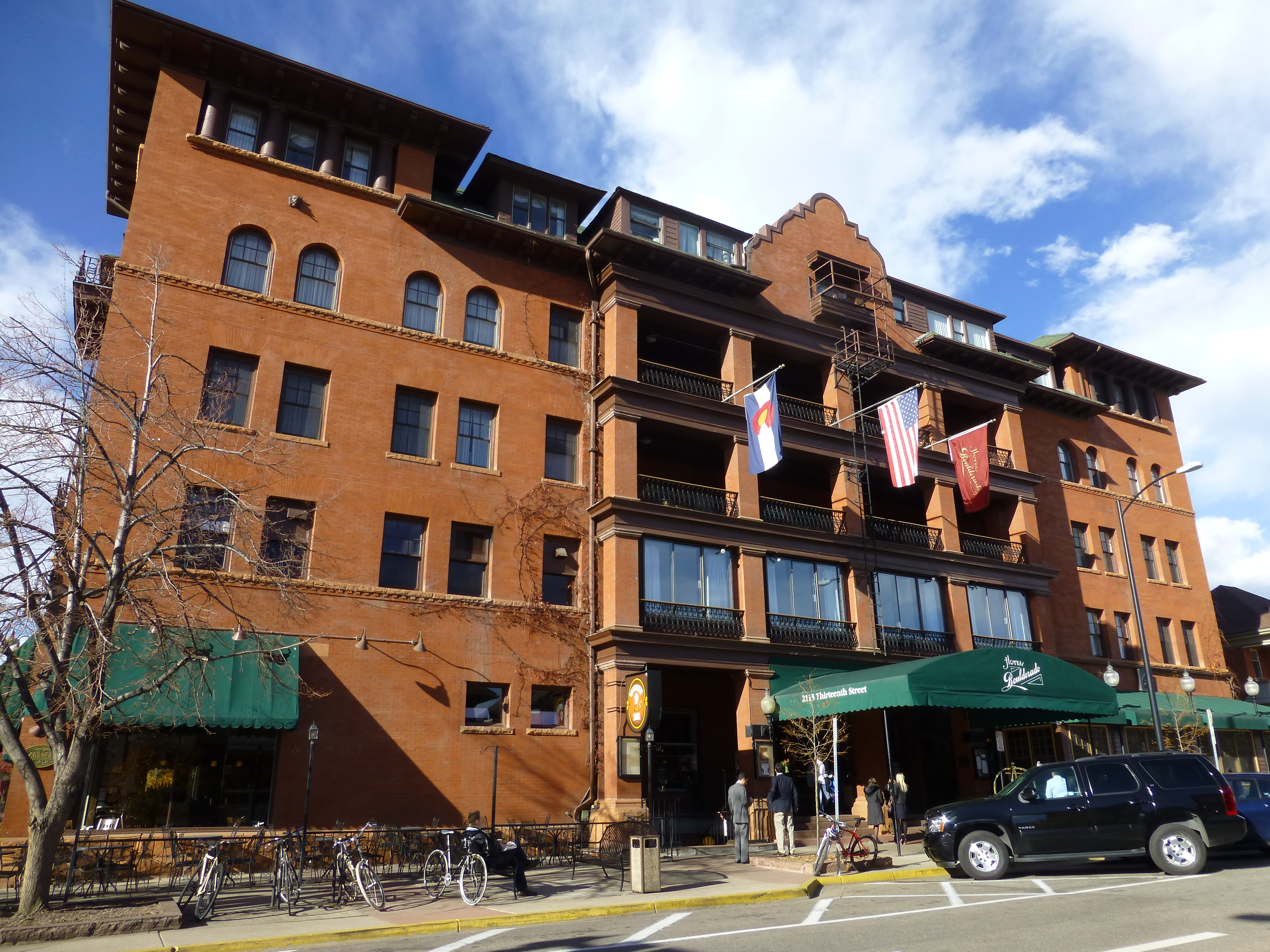
Hotel Boulderado

William Redding & Son, also known as Redding & Redding, was an architectural firm based in Denver, Colorado. The partnership included William Redding and his son E. Floyd Redding. Several of the buildings the firm designed are listed on the National Register of Historic Places.

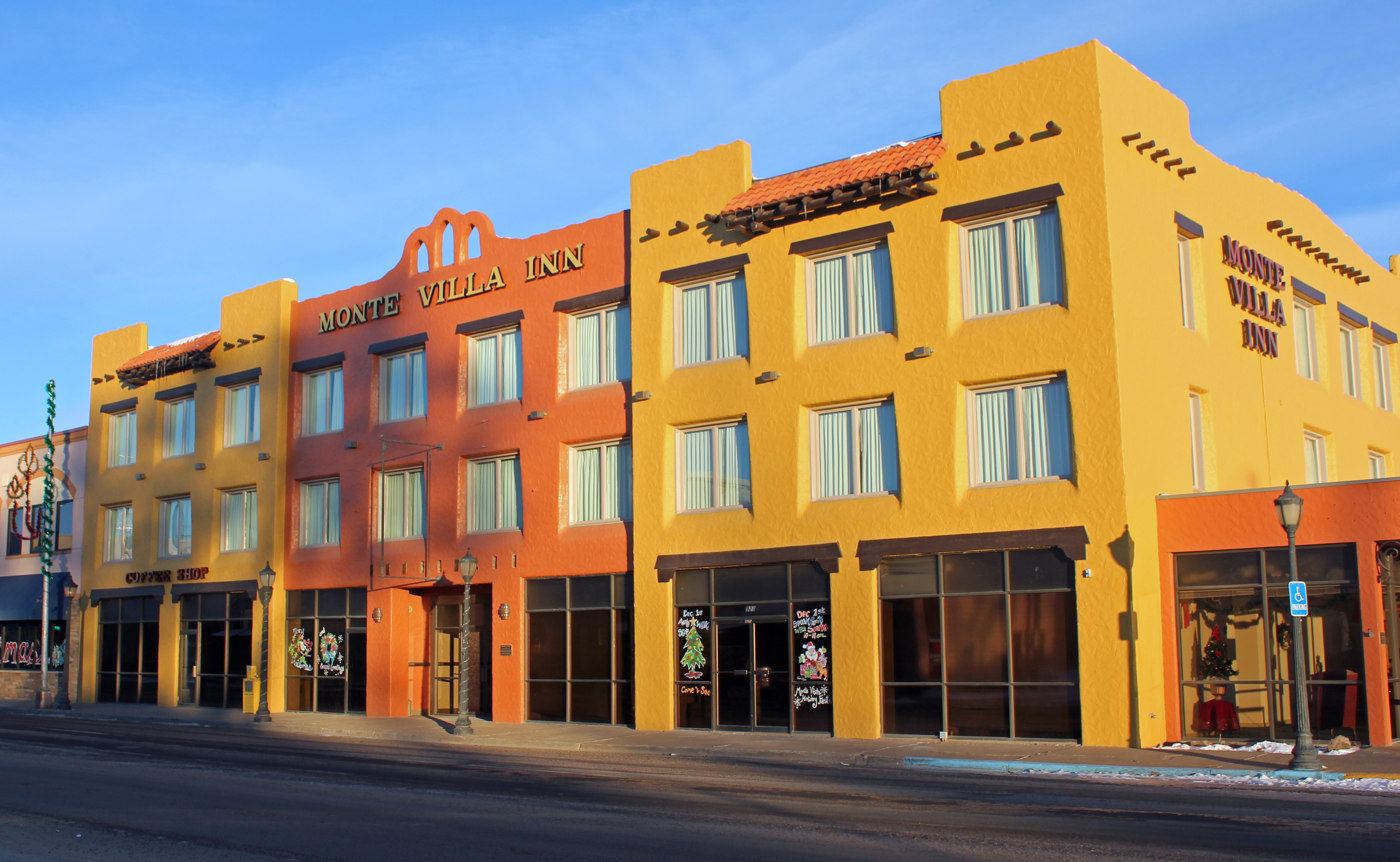
El Monte Hotel, now the Monte Villa Inn

In 1913 the firm of Redding and Redding was operating out of the Wyoming Building in Denver. Floyd Redding ran the Redding & Redding firm's Nogales, Arizona office in 1914. According to a 1918 issue of American Contractor, the firm was also known as Redding & Redding in 1918. E. Floyd Redding is credited as the architect for the El Monte Hotel at 925 First Avenue in Monte Vista, Colorado. It is listed on the National Register.

== Work ==
- Morgan County Courthouse and Jail at 225 Ensign and 218 West Kiowa in Fort Morgan, Colorado. NRHP listed
- Old Nogales High School at 209 Plum in Nogales, Arizona
- Hotel Boulderado (1909) at 2115 13th Street in Boulder, Colorado. NRHP listed
- Charles E. Blair House (1911) at 170 N. 5th Street in Laramie, Wyoming. NRHP listed
- Elks Lodge No. 607 (1907) in Idaho Springs, a Mission Style building
- Apartment building at 2140 California Street in Denver
- 1121 Josephine st Denver 1893, Denver Colorado

== Gallery ==
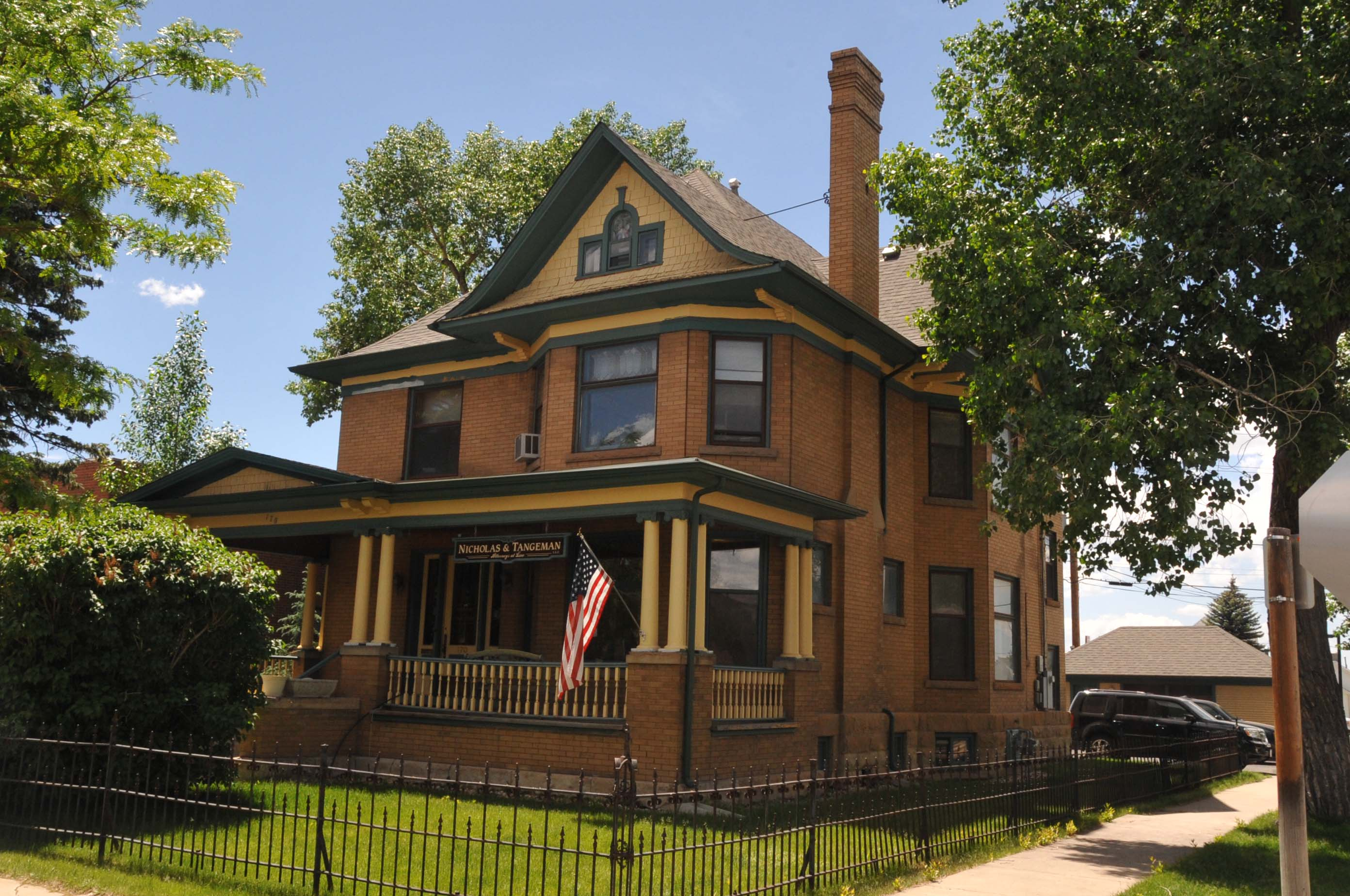
Charles E. Blair House

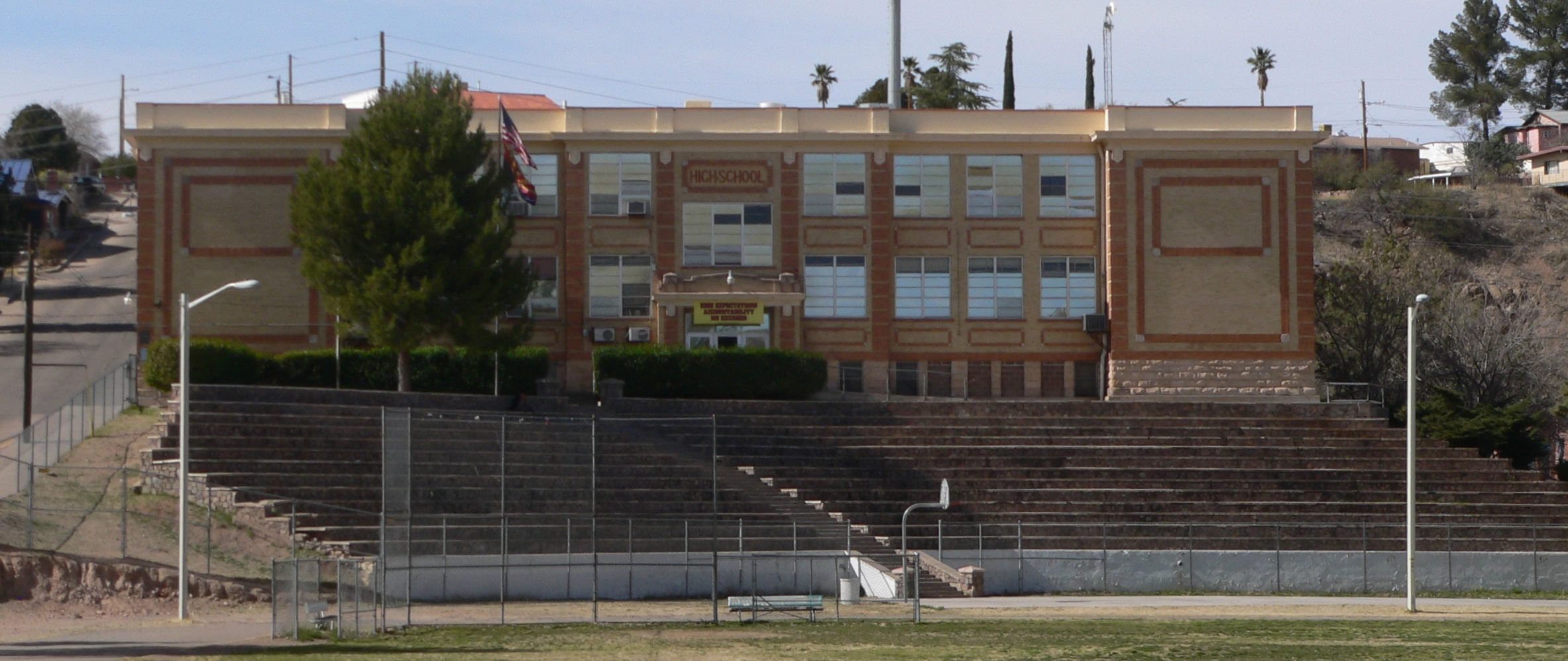
Old Nogales High School

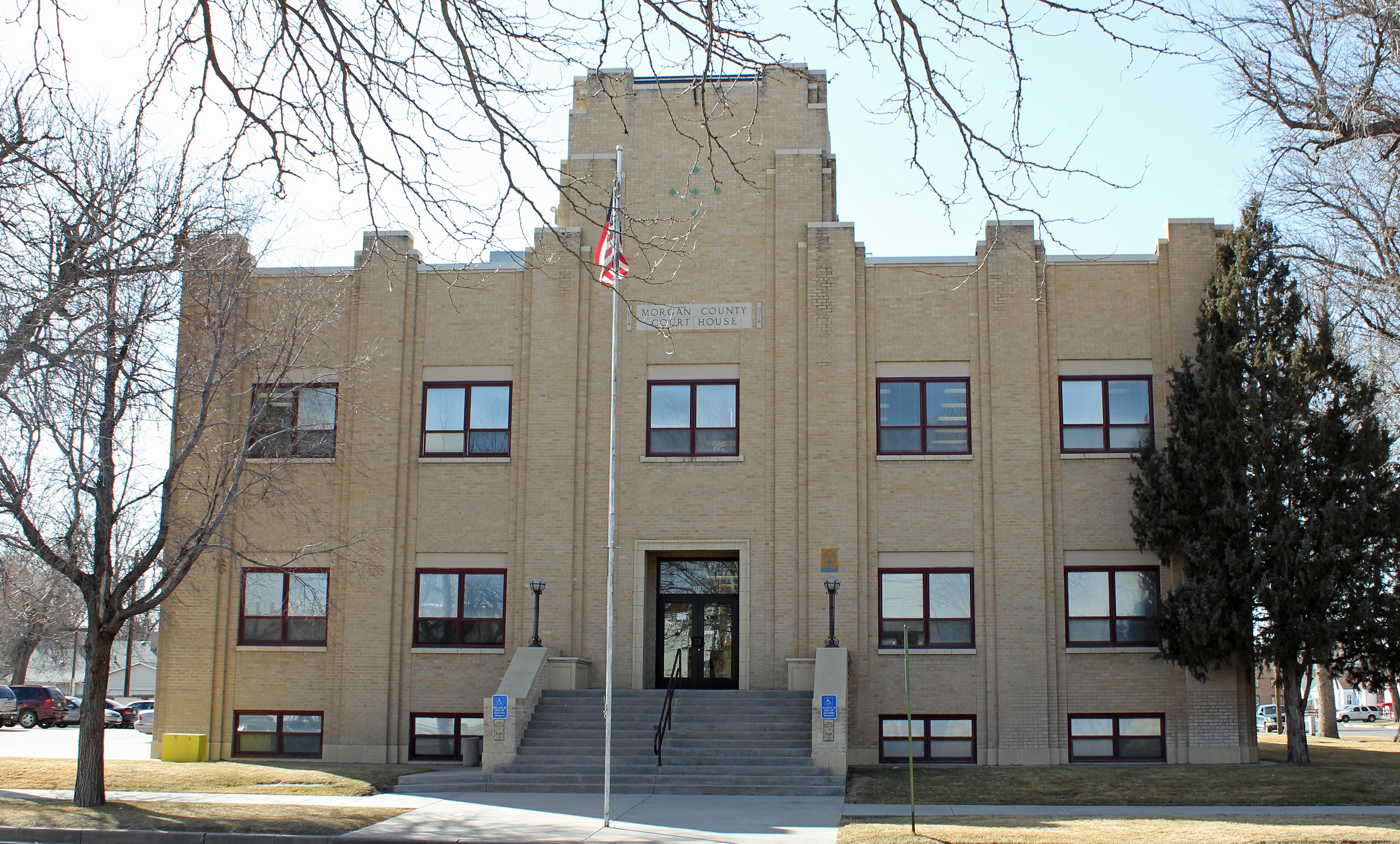
Morgan County Courthouse and Jail
