= 2025 Boulder fire attack =

Attack in Boulder, Colorado, US

- Location: 40°01′07″N 105°16′41″W; Pearl Street Mall, Boulder, Colorado, United States
- Date: June 1, 2025 c.1:26 p.m. (MDT)
- Target: Walk participants from Run for Their Lives
- Attack type: Firebombing
- Weapons: Makeshift flamethrower Molotov cocktails
- Deaths: 1
- Injuries: 13 (including the perpetrator)
- Perpetrator: Mohamed Soliman
- Motive: Antisemitism
- Charges: Hate crime act - actual or perceived race, religion, or national origin (1 count under 18 U.S.C. § 249)
- Verdict: Guilty to state charges
- Convictions: Attempted first-degree murder – extreme indifference (8 counts under C.R.S. § 18-3-102); Attempted first-degree murder – after deliberation (8 counts under C.R.S. § 18-3-102); First-degree assault - at-risk victim (6 counts under C.R.S. § 18-3-202); First-degree assault (2 counts under C.R.S. § 18-3-202); Possession of an incendiary device (2 counts under C.R.S. § 18-12-109); Attempted possession of an incendiary device (16 counts under C.R.S. § 18-12-109)

On June 1, 2025, a group participating in a solidarity walk for hostages held during the Gaza war in Boulder, Colorado, United States, was attacked by Mohamed Sabry Soliman, an Egyptian national residing in Colorado. The attack left at least seven people injured, including the perpetrator. An 82-year-old woman died 24 days later from injuries suffered during the attack.

During the antisemitic attack, Soliman yelled several political expressions. In a subsequent police interview, he said that he targeted the group because he believed its members were Zionists. Soliman was charged with a dozen charges of federal hate crime and 118 state criminal charges. In May 2026, Soliman pleaded guilty to all state charges and was sentenced to life without parole plus 2,128 years in prison. In October 2026, Soliman changed his plea to guilty for a dozen federal charges that included a hate crime resulting in a death and seven counts of hate crimes causing bodily injury with intent to kill.

== Background ==
A solidarity walk was organized by the local Boulder chapter of Run for Their Lives, a national group which has hosted weekly events since the Hamas-led October 7 attacks, in support of the hostages held in Gaza. The walk began at Pearl Street and 8th Street, passed through the Pearl Street Mall, and included a scheduled video presentation at the old Boulder County Courthouse. The organizers said that the event was not a protest, but rather a nonviolent march intended as a plea for the release of the hostages.

== Attack ==
Before the attack, the attacker dressed himself as a gardener so he could get close to the walkers without attracting much attention. He bought flowers from Home Depot, wore an orange vest, and carried a backpack weed sprayer filled with gasoline.

Witnesses reported that at around 1:26 p.m. MDT, a shirtless man threw Molotov cocktails at participants in the walk near 13th Street and Pearl Street. Miri Kornfeld, an organizer with Run for Their Lives, told KUSA-TV that when they arrived, a man was waiting there and threw bottles at them. A woman was badly burned and had to roll on the ground to put the fire out. According to the FBI, the attacker yelled "End Zionist", "Free Palestine", and "How many children killed" during the attack.

Video footage and images from the scene showed burn damage on the sidewalk, and at least one person being taken away on a stretcher. Police chief Stephen Redfearn said multiple teams were still in downtown Boulder "clearing that area for devices", which included police dogs and bomb squads. This was to ensure the safety of the area before it was reopened.

Police said they arrested a man at the scene. According to police, the accused said that he threw two out of eighteen incendiary devices at the group of approximately 20 people. He accidentally burned himself after spraying himself with gasoline using the backpack device, telling investigators he planned on dying.

== Victims ==
State prosecutors had initially fifteen people, eight women and seven men, as victims, with the victims' ages ranging from 25 to 88. Some of the victims were not physically injured, but they were nonetheless considered victims because they were put at risk. The victim count eventually reached twenty-nine, thirteen of whom suffered physical injuries. Six of the victims were hospitalized, with two requiring to be airlifted by a helicopter to the hospital. The two airlifted victims were taken to UCHealth's burn unit, while the others were admitted to Boulder Community Health. Injuries included second and third degree burns; three of the victims were still hospitalized four days after the attack. An 82-year-old Jewish woman, Karen Diamond, succumbed to her severe injuries sustained in the attack on June 25.

The oldest victim, Barbara Steinmetz, is a Holocaust survivor who fled Europe, and another victim is a professor at the University of Colorado.

== Perpetrator ==
The attack was carried out by a 45-year-old Egyptian man named Mohamed Sabry Soliman (Arabic: محمد صبري سليمان), born December 15, 1979. Soliman was born and raised in el-Motamedia in Gharbia Governorate and lived in Kuwait for 17 years. He was not previously known to City of Boulder police, but the El Paso County Sheriff's Office had responded to three calls involving Soliman.

He had been living in the Cimarron Hills enclave of Colorado Springs with his wife and five children, ages 4 to 18, at the time of the attack. A neighbor told a local television station that Soliman and his family moved into their home two years prior to the attack. The neighbor's daughter was a frequent guest at Soliman's home.

According to U.S. Department of Homeland Security (DHS) officials, Soliman entered the United States on August 27, 2022, on a B-2 nonimmigrant visa, and applied for asylum the following month, September 2022. Soliman's visa expired in February 2023. In March 2023, he was granted work authorization, which expired on March 28, 2025. After that date, he remained in the United States illegally, according to the DHS and the Department of Justice (DOJ). His asylum application had not been adjudicated at the time of his arrest.

According to state and federal documents, Soliman planned the attack for a year, but waited until his daughter graduated from high school, which happened three days prior to the attack. He researched how to make Molotov cocktails after having been denied the purchase of a gun due to his immigration status. Police confirmed the Soliman used a makeshift flamethrower and an incendiary device.

== Investigation ==
The FBI immediately described the incident as a "targeted terror attack", but during a press conference, Boulder Police Chief Stephen Redfearn said it was "too early to discuss a motive". While in custody, Soliman exhibited no remorse, saying that he hates "the Zionist group", that he wanted to kill all "Zionist people", and that if given the opportunity he would do it again. He was subsequently charged with a dozen charges of hate crime, and these comments were referenced in the affidavit.

According to the affidavit, Soliman carried 18 Molotov cocktail bottles, but only used two of them “because he got scared and had never hurt anyone before”. In addition to the Molotov cocktails, Soliman carried gasoline in a commercial-grade backpack and a weed sprayer. During the investigation, he told the detectives that he planned to use the weed sprayer to kill himself by self-immolation. He also said that he had been planning the attack for a year and that he wanted to stop people from “taking over our land", which he said to be Palestine.

== Legal proceedings ==
On June 1, Soliman was booked into Boulder County Jail on forty-two state felony charges. His bail was set at ten million dollars. He was charged with a federal hate crime on June 2.

During a court hearing on June 2, Soliman appeared via a video feed from the Boulder County Jail. He was wearing a prison jumpsuit and had a bandage on his head, covering his right ear. State judge Nancy W. Salomone said that Soliman is banned from having contact with any of the victims under a restraining order and did not change his $10 million bail. His lawyer said that she would reserve argument about his bond conditions. During the hearing, the jail was put on lockdown which allowed nearby guards to monitor the courtroom and the jail’s entrance. According to a jail spokesperson, three snipers were also put on the roof of the jail for protection.

On June 5, Soliman was charged in Boulder county court with 118 state criminal charges, including 28 counts of attempted murder. The charges included animal cruelty because the attack injured a dog. He made his first federal court appearance on June 6 where he was assigned a public defender since he could not afford his own legal representation. On June 18, a federal judge ruled there was sufficient evidence to proceed with a hate crime case.

On May 4, 2026, Soliman's lawyers said that he would plead guilty to all 184 state charges against him in a plea deal which would see him sentenced to life in prison without parole plus 400 years. He pleaded guilty on May 7, and was later sentenced to life imprisonment without the possibility of parole.

On October 29, 2026, Soliman appeared before a judge in his federal case and changed his plea to guilty for a dozen federal charges that included a hate crime resulting in the death of Karen Diamond and seven counts of hate crimes causing bodily injury with intent to kill. Peter McNeilly, the United States attorney for the District of Colorado stated that Soliman had admitted that he acted based on his beliefs about the Israeli origins and Jewish religion of his victims, noting that "Anti-Semitism erodes the common ties that bind our great nation together".

== Aftermath ==
=== Perpetrator's family ===
After the attack, Immigration and Customs Enforcement (ICE) officials arrested Soliman’s wife and five children, according to DHS. Homeland Security Secretary Kristi Noem said an investigation was opened to determine if his family members had any prior knowledge about the attack. Tricia McLaughlin, spokesperson for DHS, said the government had revoked the visas of Soliman’s wife and her children. According to the arrest affidavit, Soliman said that no one, including his family, knew about his plans. The affidavit additionally said that he left a phone in his house containing messages for his family, and that his wife brought a phone to the Colorado Springs police office after his arrest and said it belonged to Soliman.

On June 4, DHS said that ICE was “processing Soliman’s family members for removal proceedings from the U.S”. The same day, federal judge Gordon Gallagher of the United States District Court for the District of Colorado temporarily halted the deportation of Soliman's wife, Hayem El Gamal, and her children, holding that they could not be subject to expedited removal, citing "irreparable harm". The family's deportation challenge was then transferred to the United States District Court for the Western District of Texas, where federal judge Orlando Luis Garcia dismissed the case on July 2, as the family was not being subjected to expedited removal as they claimed, but "are receiving the correct (and full) process due under the Immigration and Nationality Act."

On April 23, 2026, the family was released from ICE custody in Texas and traveled to Colorado per their release conditions. Two days later, they were detained once more by ICE and put on a flight to Detroit in order to be deported from the country. The family's attorneys filed an emergency motion to halt the deportation proceedings, which was granted, and the flight returned to Colorado, where the family was re-released. DHS Acting Assistant Secretary Lauren Bis put out a statement that read, in part: "The family received full due process and was issued a final order of removal on December 29, 2025. They appealed the judge's decision. The board of appeals upheld the final order of removal on April 22, 2026. Despite receiving full due process, this activist judge appointed by Bill Clinton is releasing this terrorist's family onto American streets AGAIN. ... We are confident the courts will ultimately vindicate us."

=== The marchers ===
The weekly marches in Boulder continued after the attack with increased patrols by Boulder Police. After three months, march organizers decided to keep the locations of the marches private and to make their own arrangements for security as marchers were subjected to increased levels of harassing verbal attacks with insulting slurs including "genocidal c**t," "racist," and “Nazi." One of the people harassing the marchers was a candidate actively running for the Boulder city council.

== Reactions ==
The attack was characterized as antisemitic by the City of Boulder, (Note: The statement issued by the City of Boulder was signed by the mayor, mayor pro-tem, city manager, and all but one councilmember. Councilmember Taishya Adams refused to sign the statement, citing her desire to characterize the attack as both antisemitic and anti-Zionist. A fellow councilmember criticized Adams' distinction as “pedantic” and “simply grotesque.”) the DOJ, and press reports. Due to heightened security concerns, the public participation in the Boulder City Council meeting following the attack was restricted to virtual attenance; during the meeting, the council voted 7-2 to suspend public comments for the meeting.

On June 2, a bipartisan group of Jewish state lawmakers called for “our allies to speak out” against antisemitic violence, releasing a statement which read in part, "we must confront hate forcefully, before it becomes normalized".

The Boulder Jewish Community Center held a vigil on June 4 which was attended by hundreds of people. One of the speakers at the vigil was a person who was targeted in the attack. She said it was "strange to see a man with a canister looking like he was going to spray pesticide on the grass."

Colorado Governor Jared Polis issued a statement on X, writing that "Hate is unacceptable in our Colorado for all, and I condemn this act of terror". U.S. Attorney General Pam Bondi stated that the DOJ would hold the alleged attacker "accountable to the fullest extent of the law".

U.S. President Donald Trump announced in a post on Truth Social on June 2, 2025, that Soliman would be deported in addition to his arrest under his Administration, stating: "This is yet another example of why we must keep our Borders SECURE, and deport Illegal, Anti-American Radicals from our Homeland. My heart goes out to the victims of this terrible tragedy, and the Great People of Boulder, Colorado!”. On June 4, Trump cited the incident as motivation for his second-term travel ban on foreign nationals from 12 countries and restrictions from 7 additional countries. Egypt was not among the countries listed for ban or restriction.

Israeli Prime Minister Benjamin Netanyahu condemned the attack on June 2, attributing it to the blood libel conspiracy theory.

== See also ==
- 2025 Pennsylvania Governor's Residence arson
- 2025 Capital Jewish Museum shooting
- Violent incidents in reaction to the Gaza war
