= Nogales High School (Arizona) =

Location
- 1905 North Apache Boulevard; Nogales, Arizona 85621; United States; 31°22′02″N 110°57′01″W

Information
- School type: Public High School
- Motto: Raising Student Achievement
- Established: 1915 (111 years ago)
- School district: Nogales Unified School District
- CEEB code: 030235
- Principal: Renee Travers
- Teaching staff: 71.67 (FTE)
- Grades: 9-12
- Enrollment: 1,795 (2023–2024)
- Student to teacher ratio: 25.05
- Colors: Maroon, gold, and white
- Nickname: Apaches
- Website: www.nusd.k12.az.us/o/nhs/

Nogales High School is a high school in Nogales, Arizona, US, under the jurisdiction of the Nogales Unified School District.

== History ==
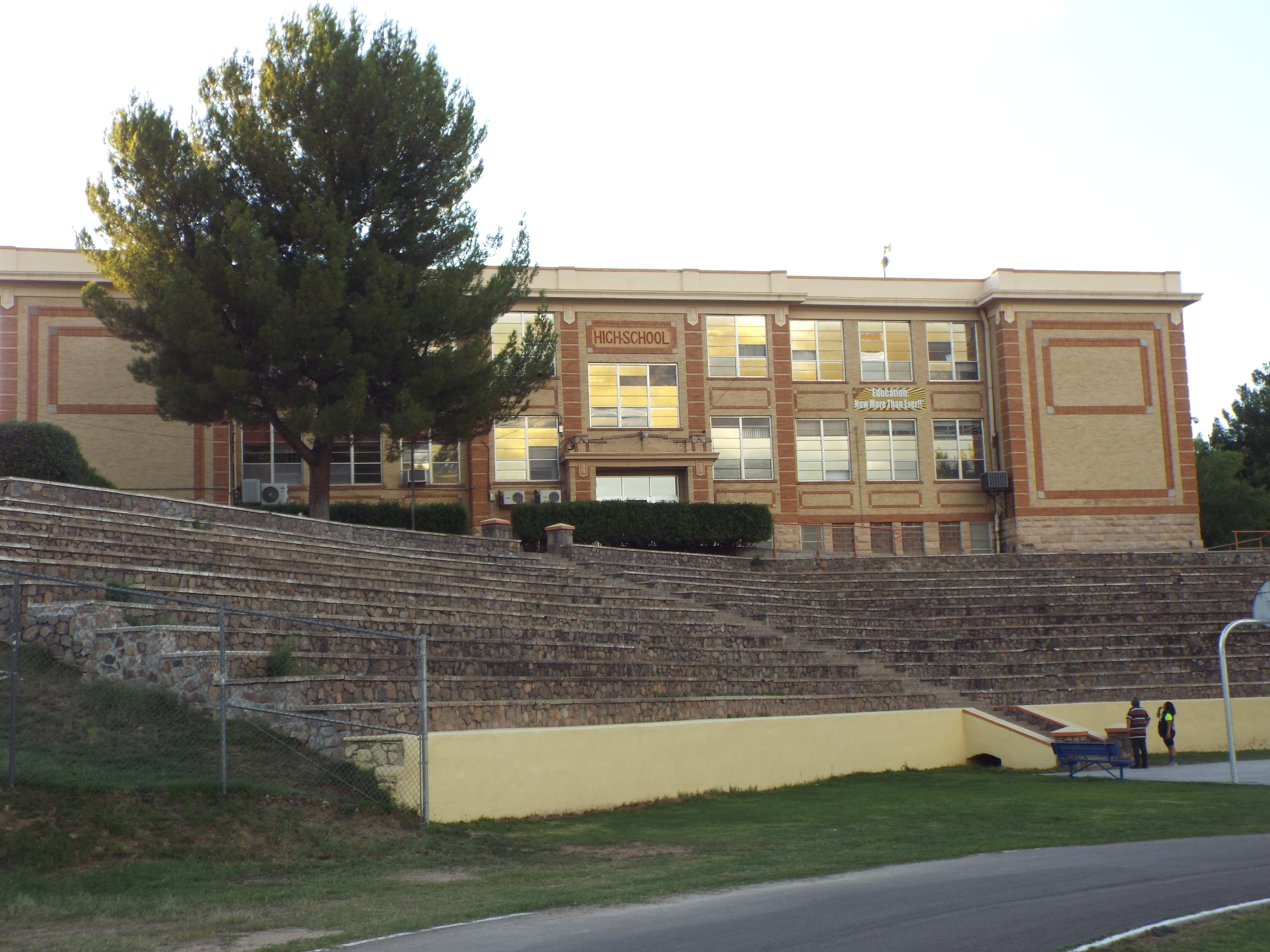
Old Nogales High School building and stadium

The old Nogales High School building from 1917 is listed on the National Register of Historic Places. It was designed by the firm of William Redding & Son. A centennial celebration for the school was held at it.

== Academics ==
Nogales High School offers an Honors Curriculum that includes Advanced Placement (AP) courses, as well as the IB Diploma Programme.

== Demographics ==
The demographic breakdown of the 1,714 students enrolled in 2013-14 was:

- Male - 50.4%
- Female - 49.6%
- Native American/Alaskan - > 0.1%
- Asian/Pacific islanders - 0.1%
- Black - > 0.1%
- Hispanic - 98.5%
- White - 1.3%
- Multiracial - 0%

== Notable alumni ==
- Bob Baffert, Hall of Fame racehorse breeder and trainer, and two-time Triple Crown winner.
- Demetrio Crisantes, professional baseball player.
- Gil Heredia, former MLB player (San Francisco Giants, Montreal Expos, Texas Rangers, Oakland Athletics)
- Marco A. López Jr., former Chief of Staff, U.S. Customs and Border Protection; Senior Advisor to Janet Napolitano
