= El Monte Hotel =

- U.S. National Register of Historic Places
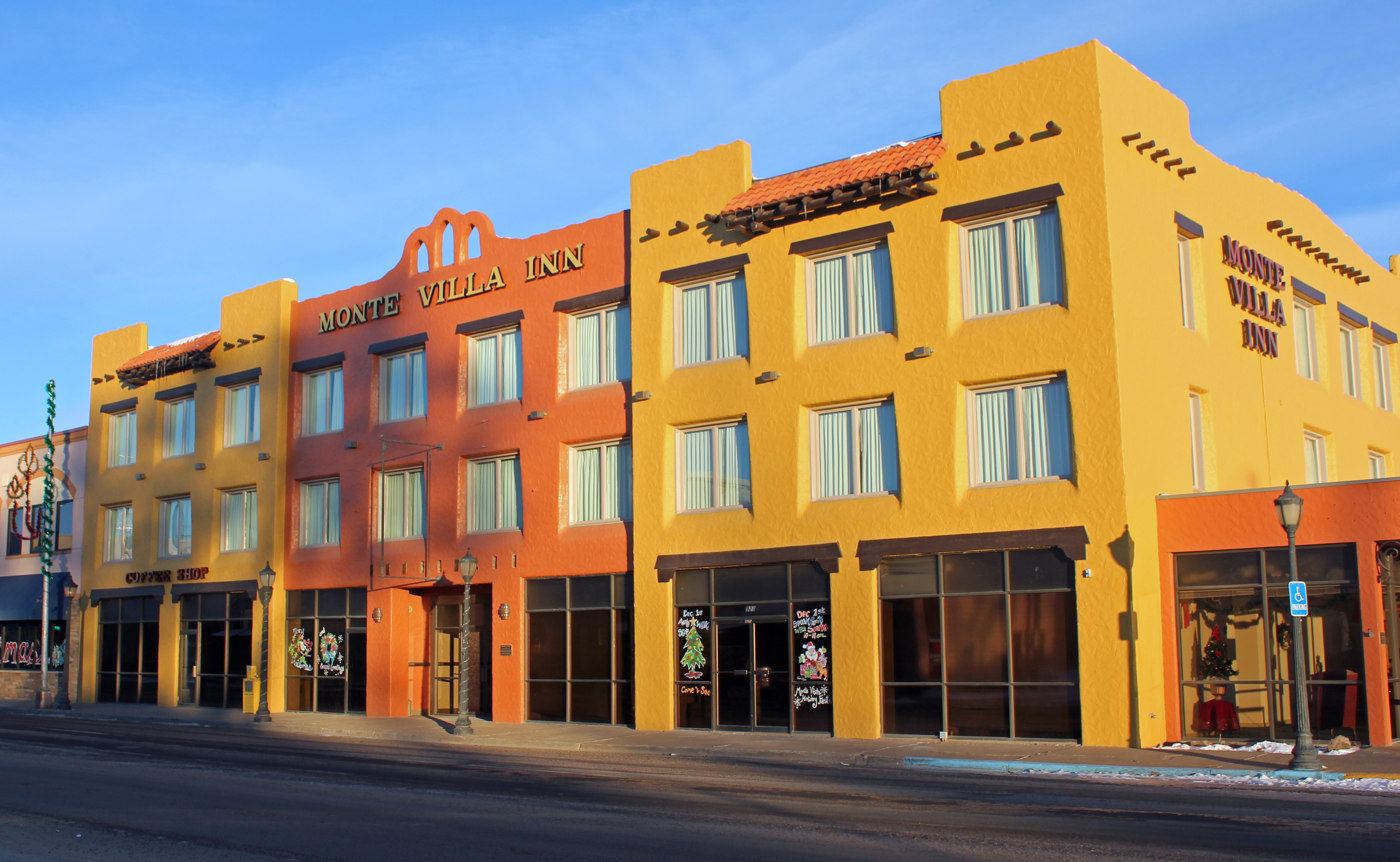
- "Monte Villa Inn" in 2012

- Location within Colorado Location within the United States
- Location: 925 First Ave., Monte Vista, Colorado
- Coordinates: 37°34′50″N 106°08′43″W
- Area: less than one acre
- Built: 1930
- Built by: Dutton & Kendall
- Architect: E. Floyd Redding
- Architectural style: Pueblo
- NRHP reference No.: 90000870
- Added to NRHP: June 7, 1990

The El Monte Hotel, located at 925 First Ave. in Monte Vista, Colorado was built between 1930 - 1931. It was listed on the National Register of Historic Places in 1990. It is now known as the Monte Villa Inn.

It was largely designed by E. Floyd Redding in Pueblo Revival style; it was built by Dutton-Kendall contractors. It is notable for its design and for how it came about.

The town and its rural area long believed that a hotel was needed, and a committee was formed. The hotel was funded by public subscription following development of a plan and estimation of construction costs of $112,000. In a week-long drive, enough $100 shares were sold to raise $72,600, which, together with a bank mortgage, was just enough to enable the building to go forward.
