= Gil Heredia =

American baseball player (born 1965)

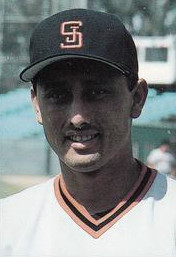
- Heredia in 1988 with the San Jose Giants
- Pitcher
- Born: October 26, 1965 (age 60); Nogales, Arizona, U.S.
- Batted: Right Threw: Right

MLB debut
- September 1, 1991, for the San Francisco Giants

Last MLB appearance
- September 19, 2001, for the Oakland Athletics

MLB statistics
- Win–loss record: 57–51
- Earned run average: 4.46
- Strikeouts: 547
- Stats at Baseball Reference

Teams
- San Francisco Giants (1991–1992); Montreal Expos (1992–1995); Texas Rangers (1996); Oakland Athletics (1998–2001)

Gilbert Heredia (born October 26, 1965) is an American former professional baseball pitcher. He played in Major League Baseball (MLB) for the San Francisco Giants, Montreal Expos, Texas Rangers, and Oakland Athletics from 1991 through 2001.

Heredia batted right-handed, and threw right-handed. He was born in Nogales, Arizona and attended Nogales High School. He then attended Pima Community College, and later the University of Arizona. He spent five seasons (1987–1991) in the San Francisco Giants minor league organization before being promoted to their Major League roster in 1991.

== Amateur career ==
Heredia attended Nogales High School where he was a member of the baseball team. Following high school he attended Pima Community College to continue his baseball career. Heredia went 15–1 as a sophomore, and was a first-team All-American at Pima. The following season he enrolled at the University of Arizona to play baseball for the Arizona Wildcats. He helped lead the team to the 1986 College World Series where they won the national title.

== Professional career ==
Gil Heredia made his debut with the San Francisco Giants in 1991, and appeared in 20 games from 1991–1992. On August 18, 1992, he was traded to the Montreal Expos in exchange for Brett Jenkins. Heredia played four seasons with Montreal, from 1992–1995. After one season with the Texas Rangers in 1996, he missed the entire 1997 season. He returned to the majors the following year with the Oakland Athletics.

A relief pitcher for most of his career, Heredia did not become a full-time starter until he joined the A's. He pitched a career-high 200.1 innings in 1999 in his first full season with the A's. In 2000, he recorded a career-high 15 wins. He retired after the 2001 season.

== Coaching career ==
After his playing career was over, Heredia became a minor league pitching coach in the Arizona Diamondbacks organization.

In 2026, he was named as the assistant pitching coach for the ACL Angels the rookie-level affiliate of the Los Angeles Angels.
