= Nogales Unified School District =

School district in Santa Cruz County, Arizona

Address
- 310 West Plum Street Nogales, Arizona, 85621; United States

District information
- Type: Public
- Grades: PreK–12
- NCES District ID: 0405530

Students and staff
- Students: 5,520
- Teachers: 272.0
- Staff: 249.8
- Student–teacher ratio: 20.29

Other information
- Website: www.nusd.k12.az.us

The Nogales Unified School District is the school district for the town of Nogales, Arizona. It serves some 6,200 students in ten schools (six elementary schools, two middle schools, and two high schools: Nogales High School and Pierson Vocational High School). Its superintendent is Fernando Parra.

In March 2015 David Safier of the Tucson Weekly wrote that Nogales USD "cited as a model for what schools serving kids from poor families can accomplish" since the schools received high Arizona state test scores despite having students from low income backgrounds. In March 2015 the Arizona Department of Education accused Wade Carpenter Middle School staff of modifying answers on students' standardized tests.
