= Boulder Post Office =

- US Post Office-Boulder Main
- U.S. National Register of Historic Places
- U.S. Historic district – Contributing property
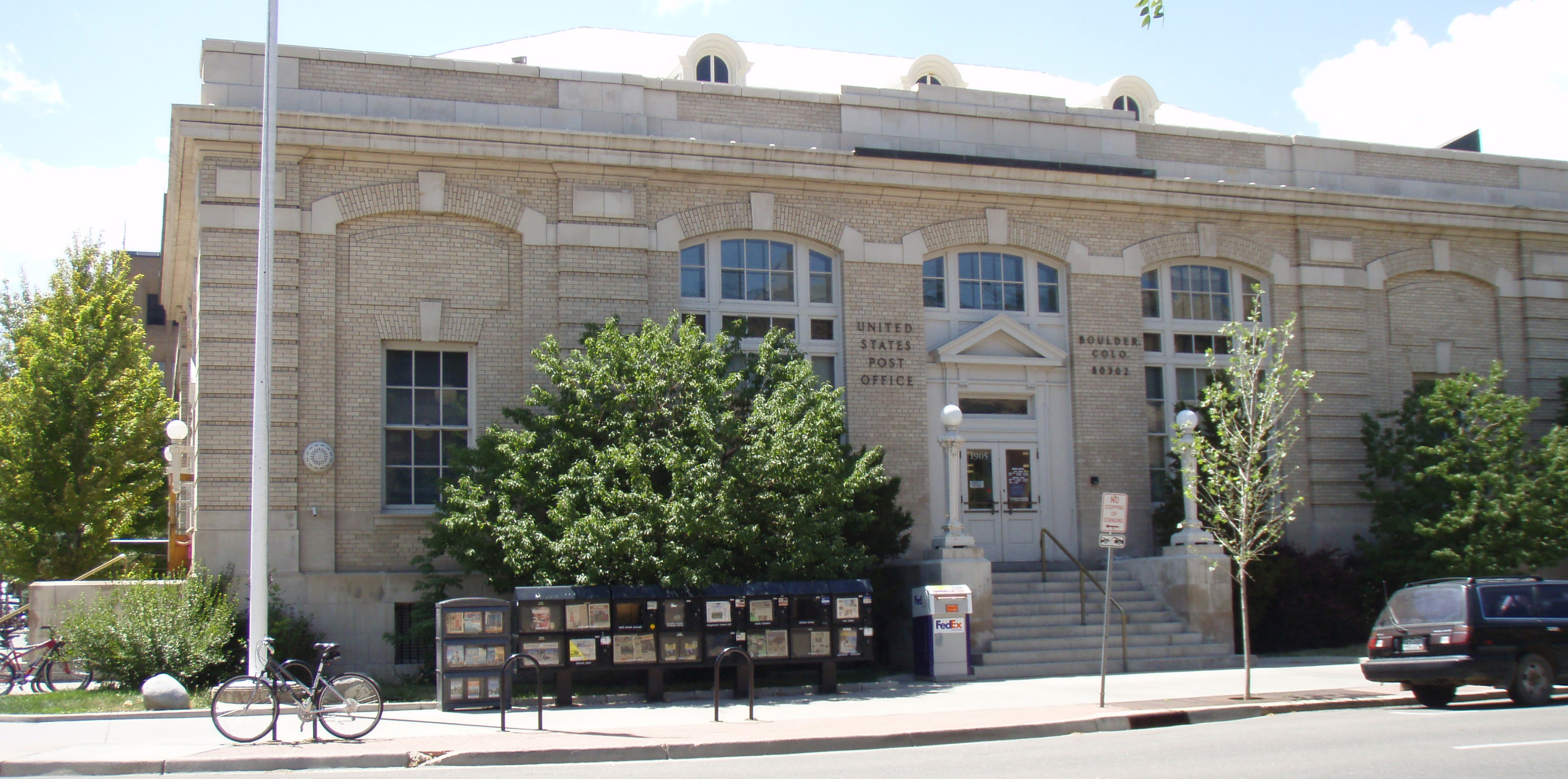
- Post office in 2009

- Location within Colorado
- Location: 1905 Fifteenth St., Boulder, Colorado
- Coordinates: 40.017899°N 105.2762264°W
- Area: 0.8 acres (0.32 ha)
- Built: 1910
- Architect: James Knox Taylor
- Architectural style: Renaissance Revival, Classical Revival
- Part of: Downtown Boulder Historic District (ID80000878)
- MPS: US Post Offices in Colorado, 1900--1941, TR
- NRHP reference No.: 86000164

Significant dates
- Added to NRHP: January 22, 1986
- Designated CP: December 3, 1980

The Officer Eric H. Talley Post Office Building, also known as the Boulder Post Office or Boulder Main Post Office, at 1905 Fifteenth St. in Boulder, Colorado, was built in 1910. It was listed on the National Register of Historic Places as US Post Office—Boulder Main in 1986. On August 4, 2022, following the 2021 Boulder shooting, the building was dedicated in honor of police officer Eric Talley, who was killed while responding to the shooting. Local Congressman Joe Neguse introduced the legislation to rename the post office in the months following the shooting, which was signed into law in March of 2022.

It is a rectangular building taking up nearly all of the site's 220 by 150 feet (67 m × 46 m) footprint. It has Renaissance Revival and Classical Revival details and was designed by the supervising architect of the U.S. Treasury James Knox Taylor. It has a metal hipped roof.

It was deemed significant as "a well preserved and rare example of the type of post office building constructed during James Knox Taylor's tenure as Supervising Architect. (Note: However by 2013 there were 102 listings on the National Register of post offices and courthouses attributed to James Knox Taylor, per NRIS version of 2013.) The building is a notable interpretation of Classical and Renaissance Revival styling and has considerable urban design significance in relation to the town's civic center."

It is also a contributing building in the Downtown Boulder Historic District, which was NRHP-listed in 1980.
