= Charles E. Blair House =

- U.S. National Register of Historic Places
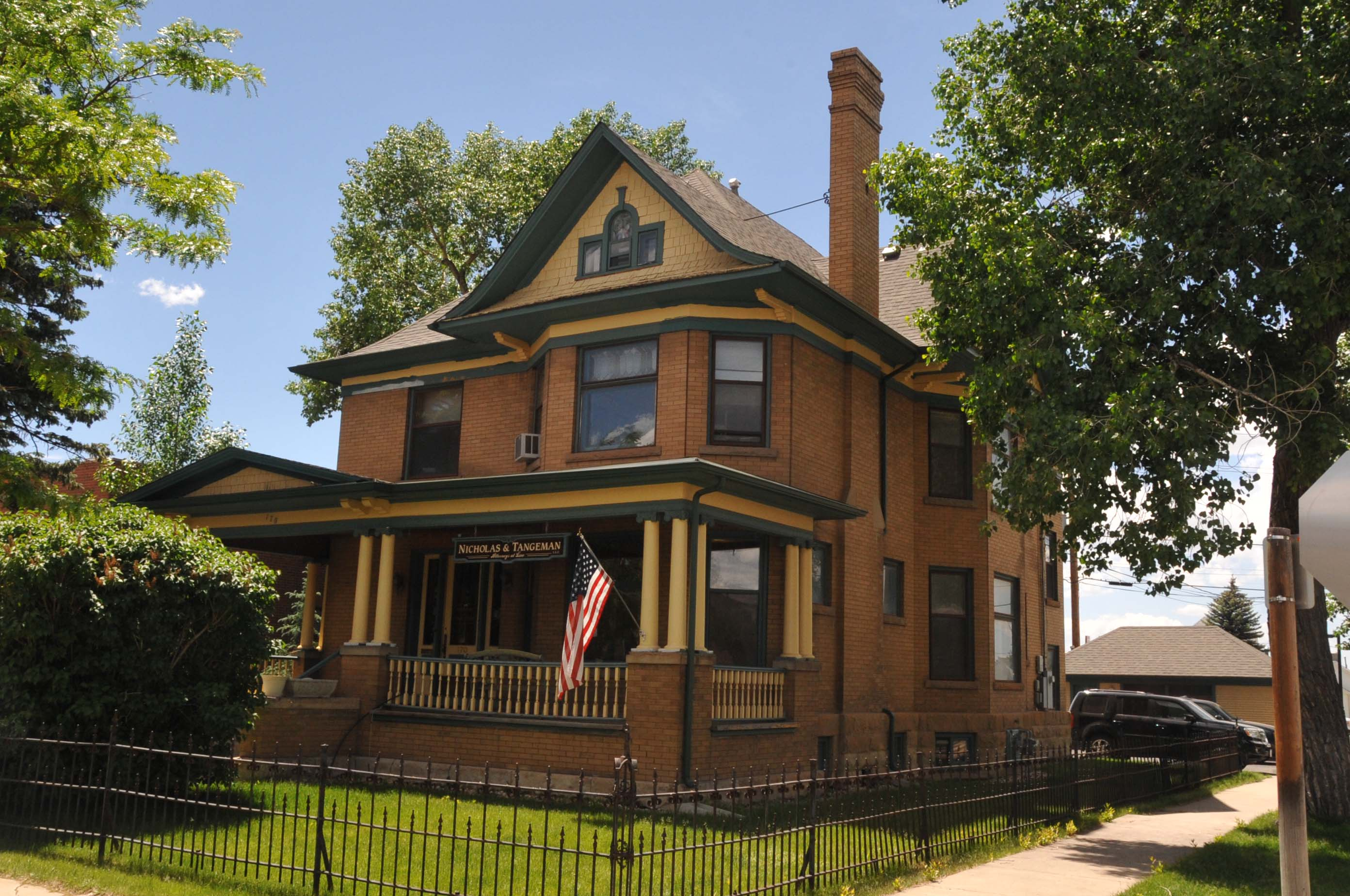
- Blair House in 2013

- Location within Wyoming Location within the United States
- Location: 170 N. 5th St., Laramie, Wyoming
- Coordinates: 41°18′49″N 105°35′26″W
- Area: less than one acre
- Built: 1911
- Architect: William Redding and Son
- Architectural style: Late Victorian
- NRHP reference No.: 80004298
- Added to NRHP: October 31, 1980

The Charles E. Blair House is a late Victorian-style house in Laramie, Wyoming. Built in 1911 it represents a late, austere version of Victorian architecture, using a yellowish "blond" brick that became available after 1900 in Wyoming. The plan is rectangular with two projecting bays crowned by deep gables above the second floor. A broad porch fronts the house. An entry hall in the left front corner contains the stairs. Rooms are mainly accessed from each other.

The Blair House was placed on the National Register of Historic Places on October 31, 1980.
