= Pierson Vocational High School =

Coordinates: 31°20′26″N 110°56′26″W

Location
- 451 N. Arroyo Blvd. Nogales, Arizona 85621; United States

Information
- School type: Public high school
- School district: Nogales Unified School District
- CEEB code: 030237
- Principal: Joel Kramer
- Teaching staff: 8.00 (FTE)
- Grades: 9-12
- Enrollment: 155 (2023–2024)
- Student to teacher ratio: 19.38
- Colors: White and blue
- Mascot: Mexican Grey Wolf
- Website: pvhsprincipal.jimdofree.com

Pierson Vocational High School is a high school in Nogales, Arizona under the jurisdiction of the Nogales Unified School District.
