= Pearl Street Mall =

Pedestrian mall in Boulder, Colorado

Coordinates: 40.018360°N 105.278026°W

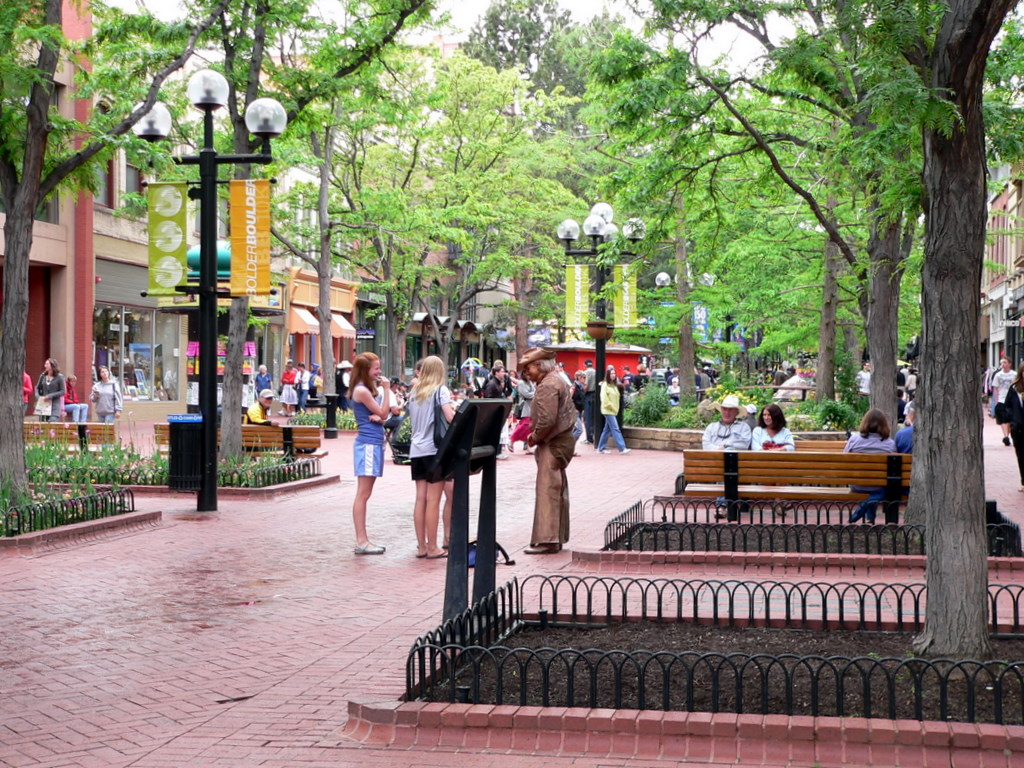
Pearl Street Mall in Boulder, Colorado

The Pearl Street Mall (also referred to as Pearl Street, or Downtown Boulder) is a four-block pedestrian mall in Boulder, Colorado, United States. The pedestrian area stretches from 11th Street to 15th Street along Pearl Street and is home to a number of businesses and restaurants as well as the Boulder County Courthouse.

== About ==
The Pearl Street Mall is a popular destination for tourists visiting Boulder and for students attending the nearby University of Colorado Boulder. The mall hosts a blend of locally owned businesses and national chain stores and restaurants. It is also home to much of Boulder's nightlife. During the summer months, Pearl Street Mall is the stage for a number of street performers, including musicians.

The Pearl Street Mall is filled with public art, including numerous fountains and sculptures as well as a sandbox for children, a stylized map of Boulder County and a number of small gardens which are planted with a variety of flowers and trees, most notably tulips in the spring.

The Mall is at the heart of downtown Boulder, in the western part of present-day Boulder. The area is an historic district and many of the buildings are among the oldest in Boulder. The Boulder County Courthouse is located in the 1300 block on the north side of the mall. Although the courthouse no longer houses the actual courts for Boulder County, it remains the seat of county government.

== History ==
Pearl Street Mall between 13th Street and 14th Street

As a Planning Board member, Carl A. Worthington began working on the project in 1966 in an attempt to revitalize Boulder's downtown. In 1973, he prepared a master plan which was approved by an 86% majority. The design team consisted of three firms: Communication Arts, Inc. (Boulder), Everett Ziegel Associates (Boulder), and Watertown, Massachusetts-based Sasaki Associates. Richard Foy, one of the architects for Communication Arts, cited the 1945 French film Les Enfants du Paradis as an inspiration for the mall, with scenes of busy Parisian streets filled with pedestrians and buskers.

The Boulder City Council voted unanimously to approve the creation of the mall on January 28, 1975. On August 4, 1975, the Boulder City Council unanimously voted to establish a special assessment of $1.2 million to pay the cost to construct the mall, despite criticism from citizens that the assessment would increase costs for property owners in the area. The special assessment was in addition to $650,000 in funding provided by the federal Community Development Act, covering a total construction cost of $1.85 million.

The Pearl Street Mall was constructed between June 1976 and August 1977 and was officially dedicated on August 6, 1977.

A legal challenge to the Pearl Street Mall was created by owners and tenants on Pearl Street, claiming that the city took their property rights without compensation. On December 22, 1975, the Colorado Supreme Court ruled that the Public Mall Act of 1970 was constitutional and that municipalities have the power to interfere with access to and from premises without compensation.

On January 18, 2013, a city ordinance went into effect that banned smoking on the Pearl Street Mall.

On June 1, 2025, Pearl Street Mall was the site of what the Federal Bureau of Investigation classified as a "targeted terror attack", the 2025 Boulder fire attack. Police arrested Egyptian national Mohamed Soliman for allegedly using a makeshift flamethrower and Molotov cocktails to attack a group participating in a solidarity walk for hostages taken from Israel during the October 7 attacks, leaving sixteen people injured, including the suspect. Soliman pleaded guilty to 100 state-level charges in May 2026 that included a first-degree murder charge, for which he received a life sentence with no possibility of parole; in October 2026, he changed his plea to guilty for a dozen federal charges that included a hate crime resulting in the death of Karen Diamond and seven counts of hate crimes causing bodily injury with intent to kill.

== Notable street performers ==
The Pearl Street Mall has a long history of street performers, including magicians, contortionists, jugglers, and musicians. These are some of the notable performers:

- Chuck Pyle, musician
- David Rosdeitcher, ZIP code man
- Doc Murdock, magician
- Eagle Park Slim, blues guitarist
- Ibashi-I, contortionist
- Johnny Fox, sword swallower
- Kenny Lightfoot, magician
- MasterBlaster G (Gabriel Angelo), trumpeter and dancer
- Peter Davidson, juggler
- Peter Irish, juggler
- Sven Jorgensen

== In popular culture ==
In the TV series Mork & Mindy (1978–1982), the New York Deli operated by Remo and Jean DaVinci was located at 1117 Pearl Street. The actual deli of the same name and location closed in June 1999.

Scenes from the movie Catch and Release (2006), which was set in Boulder, were filmed on the Pearl Street Mall in July 2005.

== Gallery ==
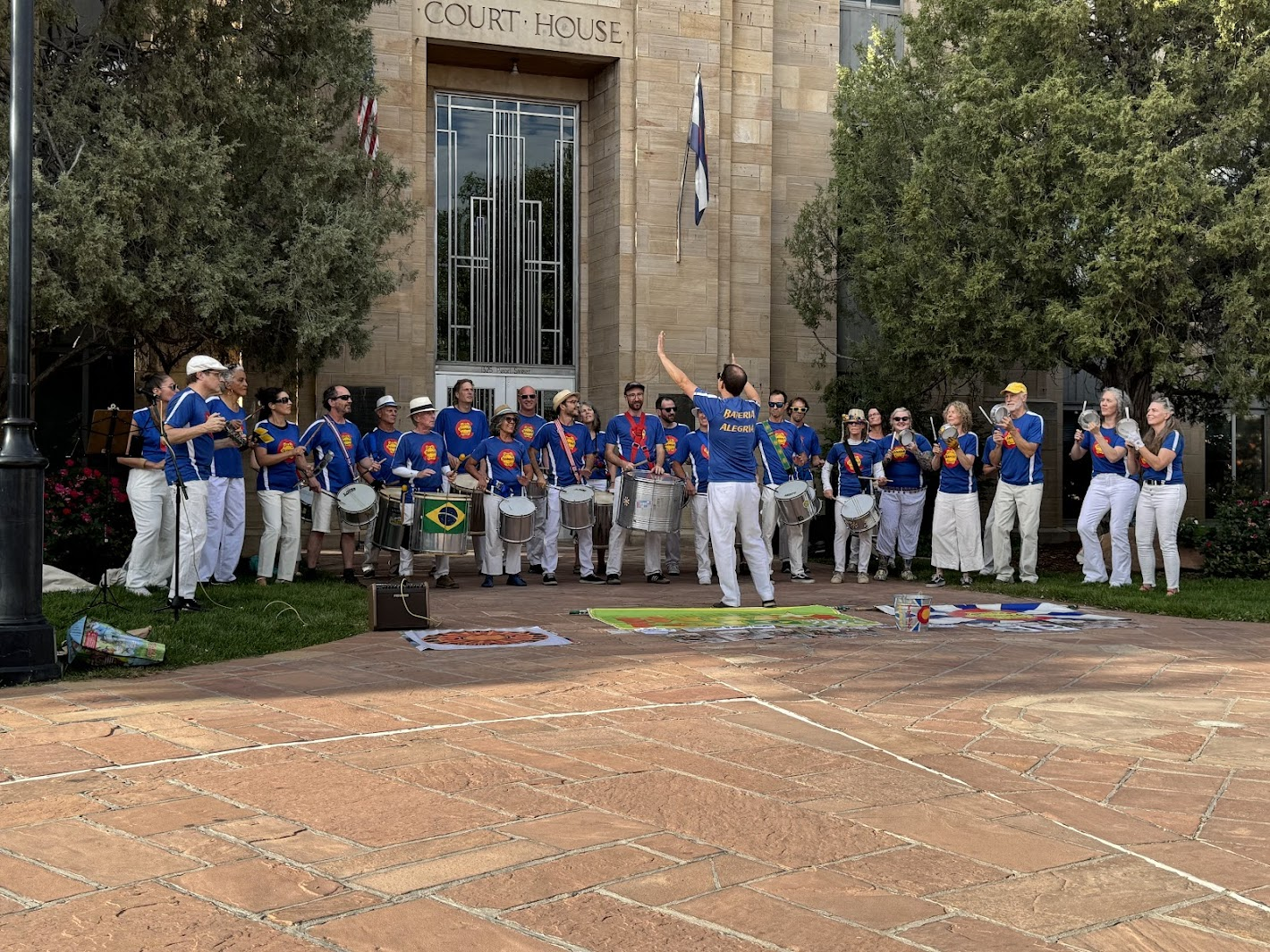
Bateria Alegria Performing on Pearl Street in Boulder, Colorado

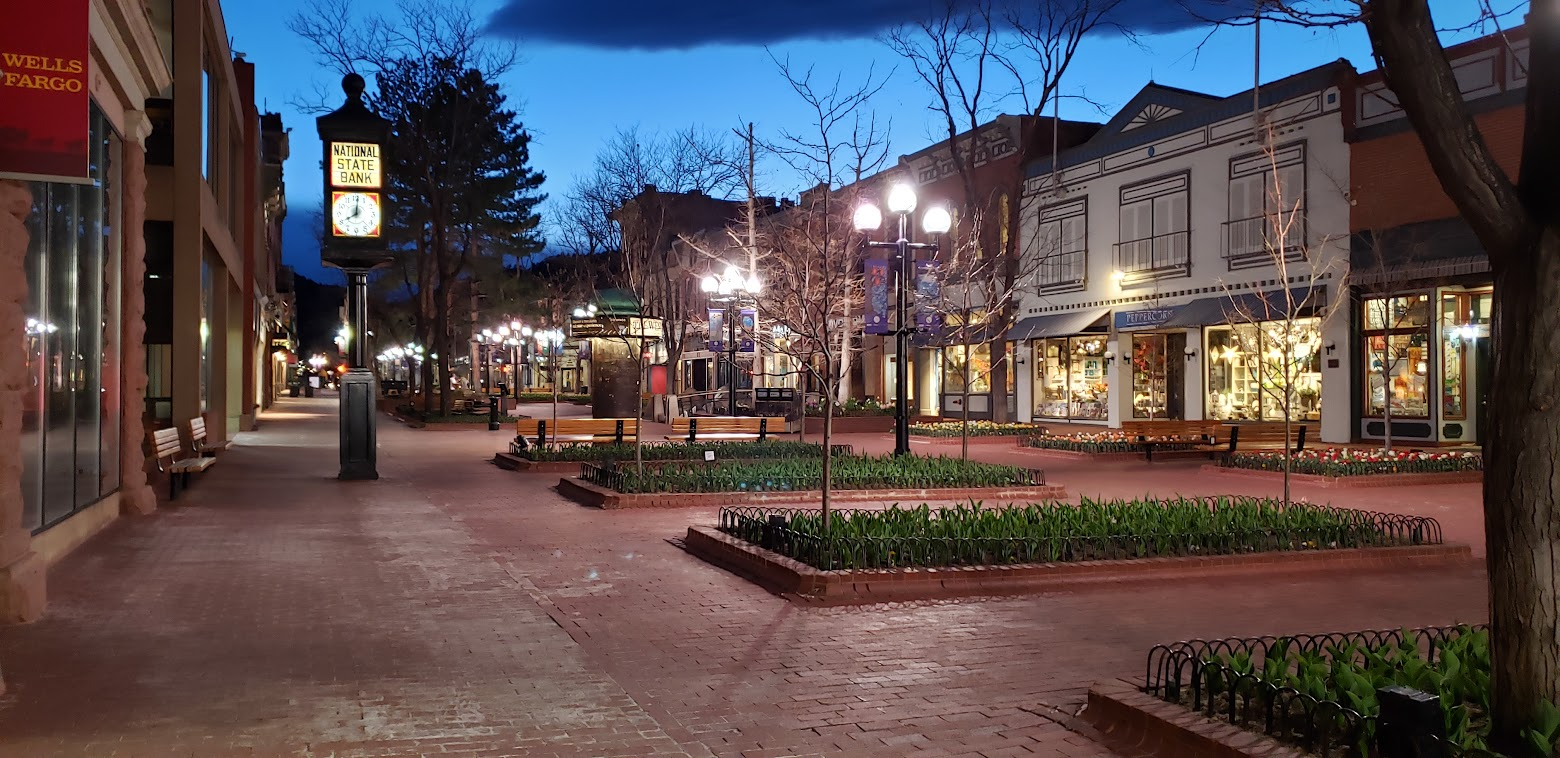
An Empty Pearl Street Mall During the Height of COVID, Boulder, Colorado

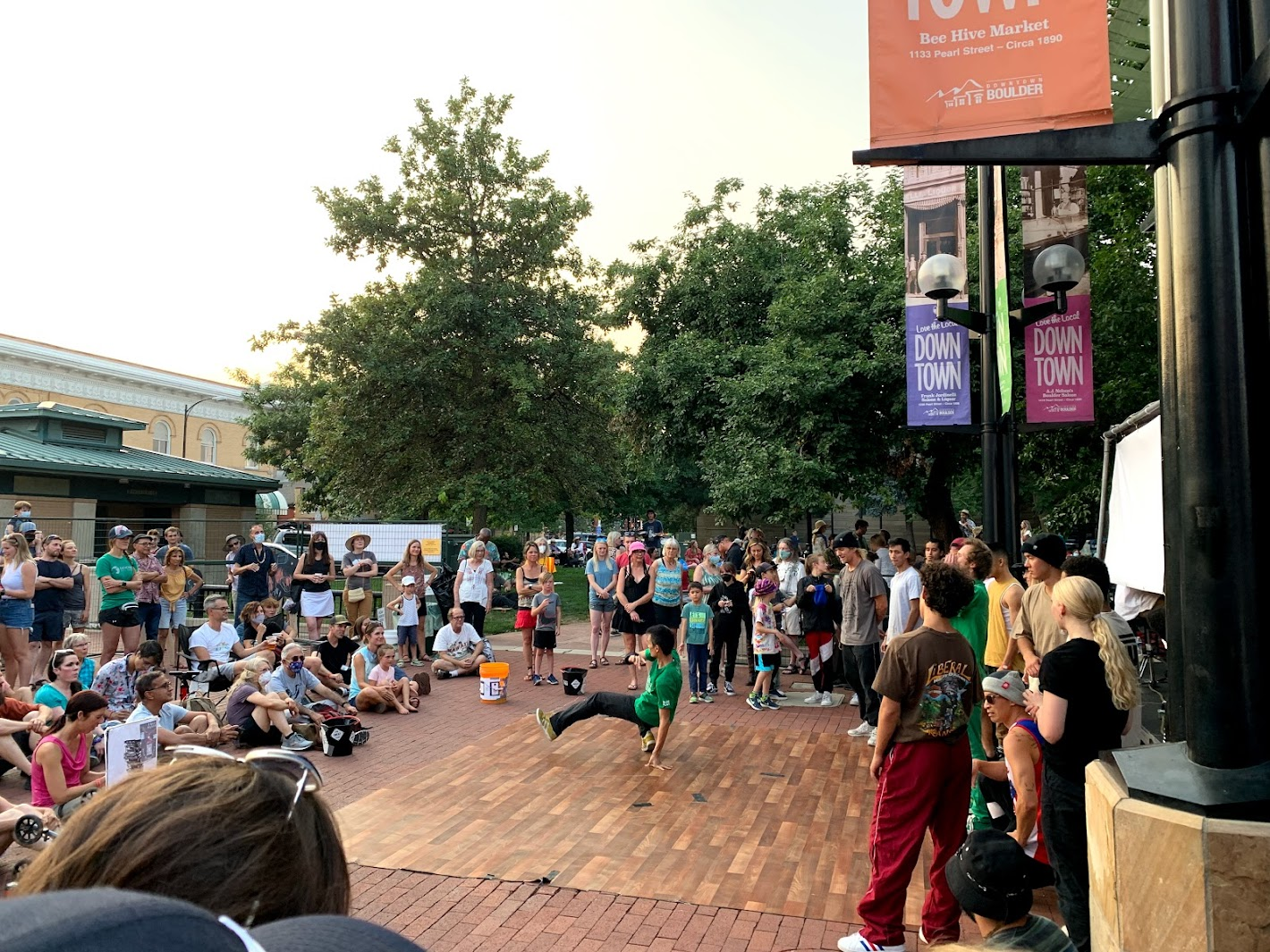
Breakdancers on Pearl Street, Boulder, Colorado

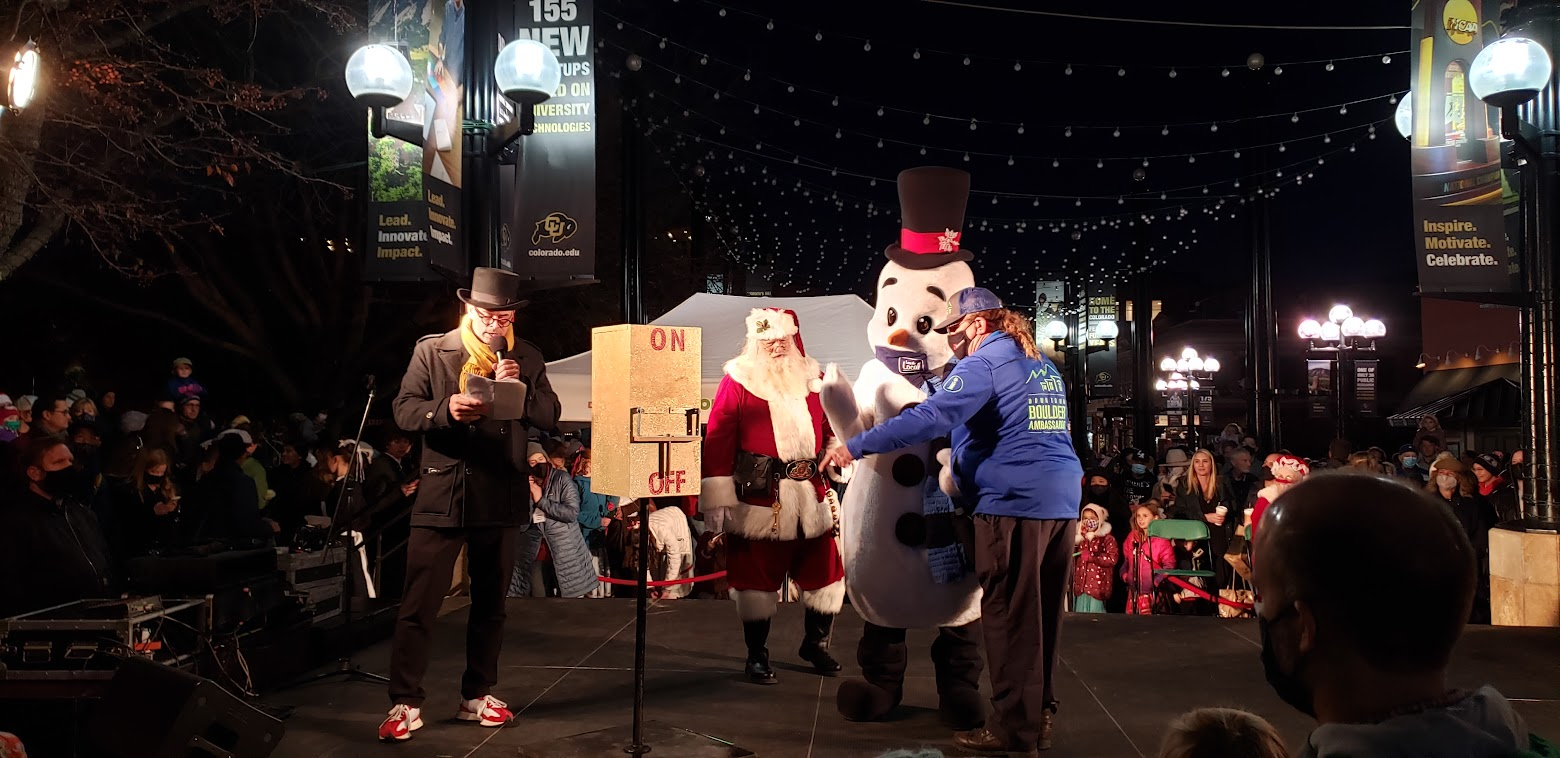
Light Up The Holidays Event, Boulder, Colorado
