= Boulder County Courthouse =

- U.S. National Register of Historic Places
- U.S. National Historic Landmark
- U.S. Historic district – Contributing property
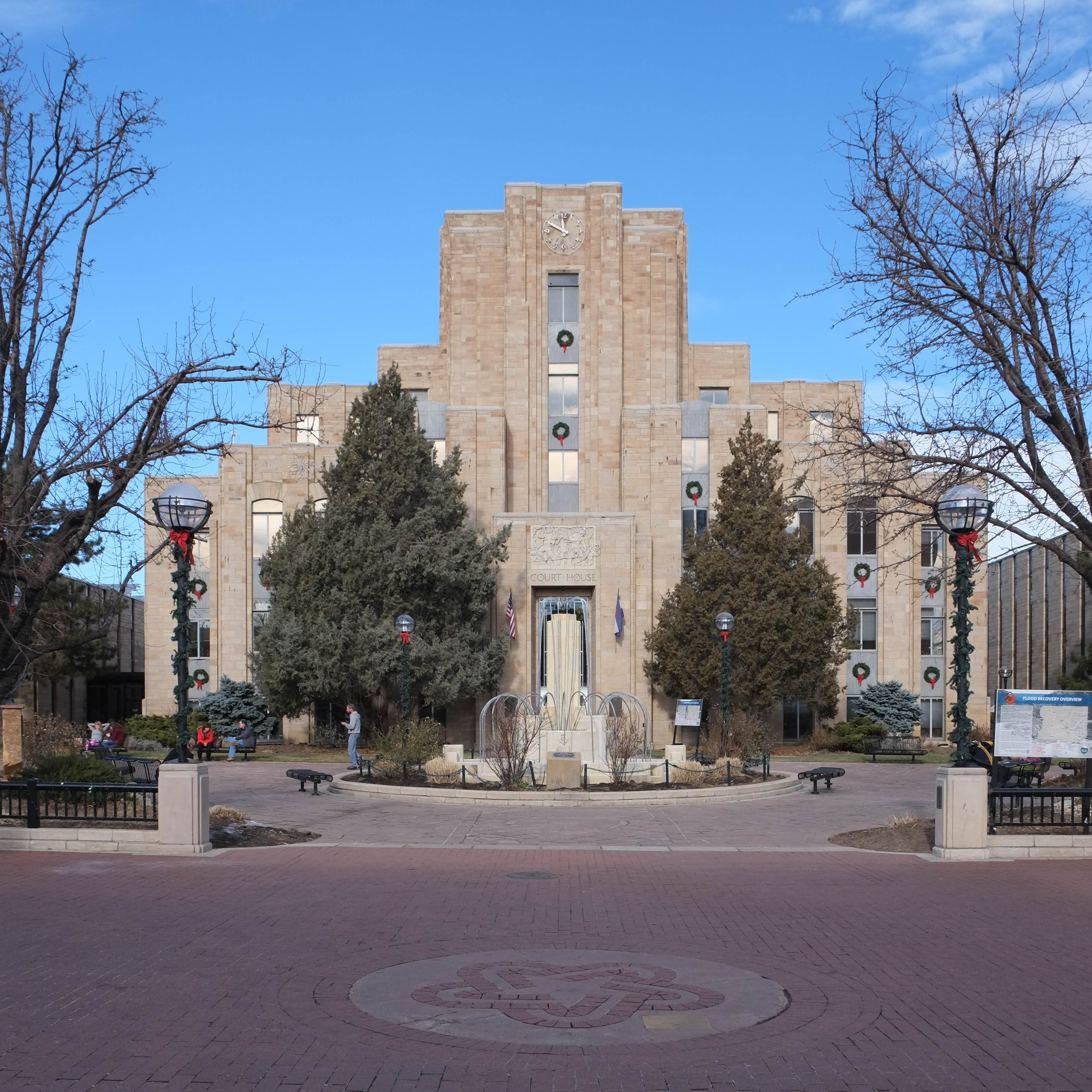
- Boulder County Courthouse, built 1933

- Location within Colorado Location within the United States
- Location: 1300 Pearl, Boulder, Colorado
- Coordinates: 40°1′5.52″N 105°16′41.16″W
- Built: 1933
- Architect: Glen H. Huntington
- Architectural style: WPA Moderne
- Part of: Downtown Boulder Historic District (ID80000878)
- NRHP reference No.: 100011355

Significant dates
- Added to NRHP: December 13, 2024
- Designated NHL: December 13, 2024
- Designated CP: December 3, 1980

The Boulder County Courthouse is a historic building on Pearl Street in Boulder, Colorado, built in 1933. The courthouse is a contributing property to the Downtown Boulder Historic District, listed on the National Register of Historic Places in 1980. In 2018, additional information about the building was added to the documentation of the district. The building was designated a National Historic Landmark in 2024 for its role as the first place in the nation where same-sex marriage licenses were issued.

== History ==
The original courthouse was built in 1882 by F.E. Edbrooke, but was destroyed by a fire in 1932. The present courthouse was re-built on the same site in the following year. It is a five-story building designed by architect Glen H. Huntington, son of prolific Denver architect Glen Wood Huntington, in WPA Moderne style (a restrained form of Art Deco architecture). It features vertical lines, a tower, and little ornamentation.

The courthouse no longer houses the actual courts for Boulder County, but it remains the seat of county government.

It was one of the first courthouses in the US to issue same-sex marriage licenses in 1975, when Boulder County clerk Clela Rorex issued licenses to 6 same-sex couples.

In 1980, it was listed on the National Register of Historic Places as one of 125 contributing buildings in the Downtown Boulder Historic District.

In 2018, the historic district's official documentation was updated "to recognize an additional area of significance of Social History for the Boulder County Courthouse, as well as the district generally, for association with the first same-sex marriage licenses issued in Colorado and the civil rights struggles of Lesbian, Gay, Bisexual, Transgender and Queer (LGBTQ) people."
