= Hotel Boulderado =

Hotel in Boulder, Colorado, US

- U.S. National Register of Historic Places
- Colorado State Register of Historic Properties
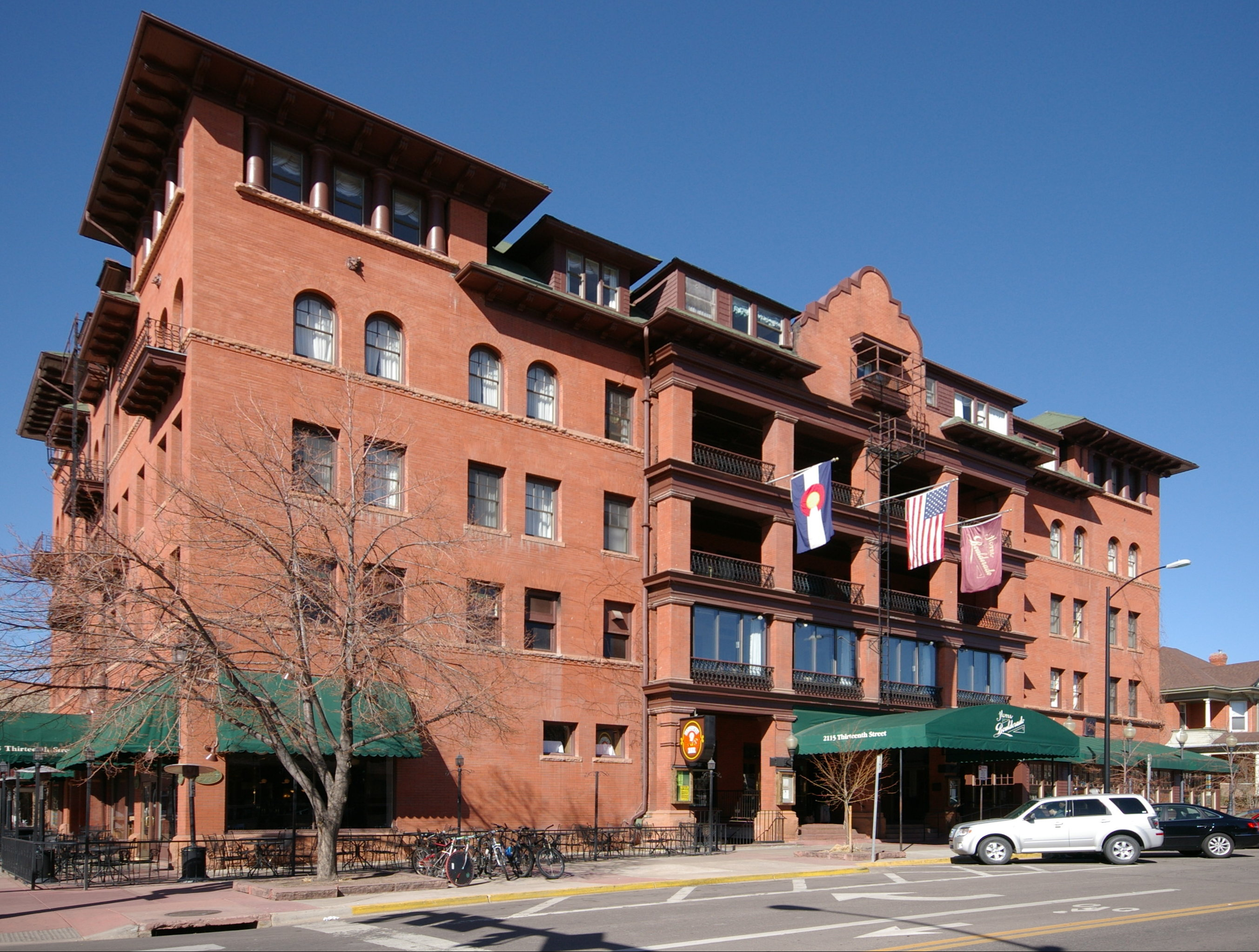

- Location within Colorado Location within the United States
- Location: 2115 13th St., Boulder, Colorado
- Coordinates: 40°1′9″N 105°16′43″W
- Built: 1909
- Architect: Redding, William, & Son; Geranson & Beckstrom
- Architectural style: Italian Renaissance/ Spanish Revival
- NRHP reference No.: 94001226
- CSRHP No.: 5BL.240.41
- Added to NRHP: November 03, 1994

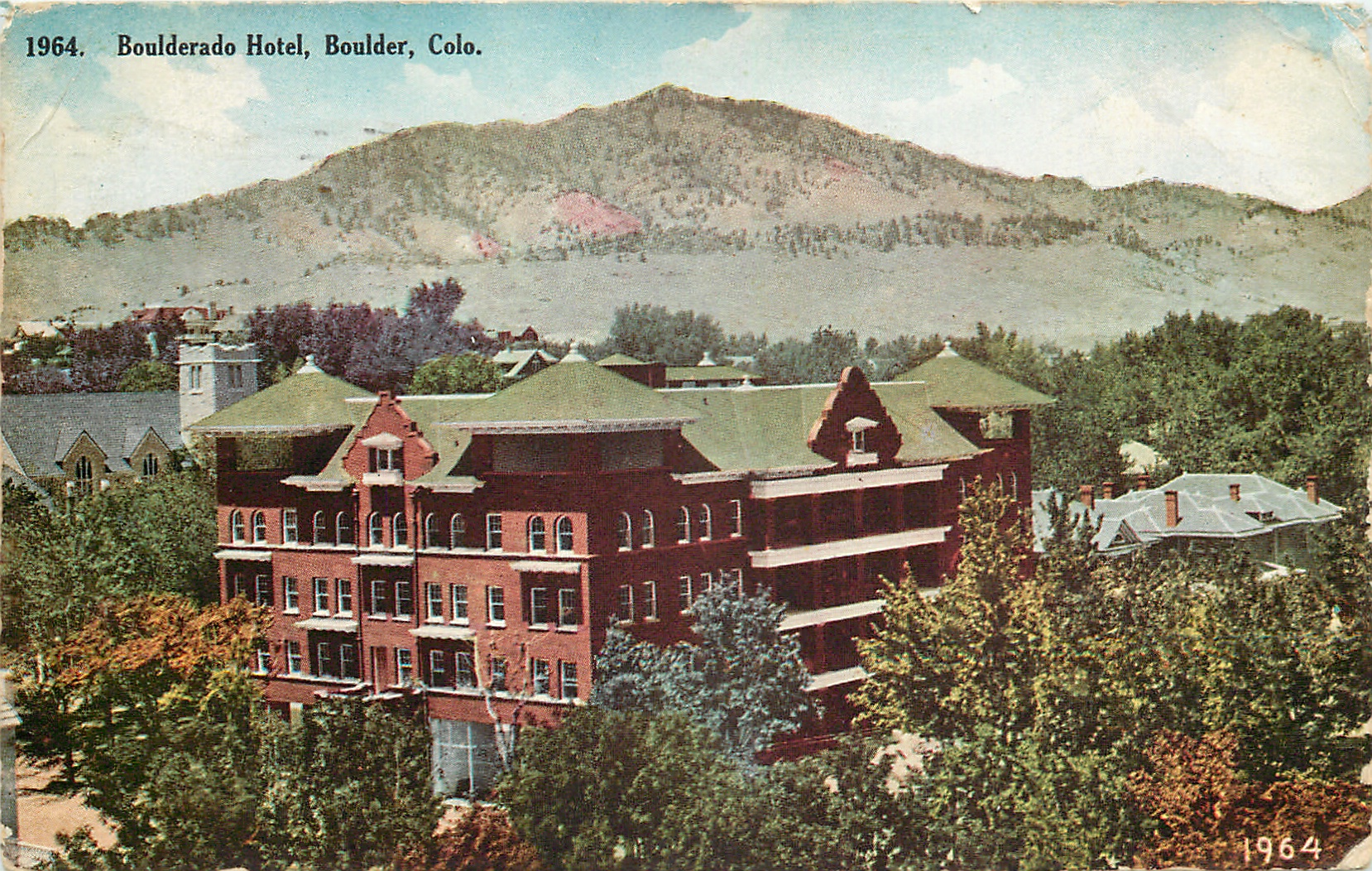
Hotel Boulderado postcard, sent 1909

The Hotel Boulderado is located at 13th and Spruce St. in downtown Boulder, Colorado. It opened on New Year's Day 1909. The original 1908 Otis Elevator is still in operation.

The hotel was designed by local architects William Redding, Floyd Redding, and James Cowie, all of whom were members of the architectural firm Redding & Sons.

In 1996, the Hotel Boulderado was made a member of Historic Hotels of America, the official program of the National Trust for Historic Preservation.

The Hotel Boulderado houses three restaurants. Located off of the main lobby are Spruce Farm and Fish, a fine-dining restaurant, and the Corner Bar, a more casual eatery. The basement contains a speakeasy-style bar, License No. 1, which recently replaced Catacombs. All three restaurants share a kitchen.

The Hotel Boulderado is mentioned in Stephen King's novels The Shining and Misery.

== History ==
In 1905, Boulder was home to 8,000 residents, the University of Colorado, one of the Chautauqua cultural and educational resorts, and twenty-six automobiles. Residents called the city the "Athens of the West." As a newly forged railroad hub, the city did have some hotels to accommodate visitors, but in December 1905, the city council launched the "hotel proposition," furthered by the Boulder newspaper, the Daily Camera. Committees from Boulder's Commercial Association raised funds in the form of $100 subscriptions, and the Boulder Hotel Company was formed, which owned the hotel until 1939.

The hotel was opened with a gala ball on New Year's Eve of 1908. The first guests checked in on New Year's Day, 1909. The first guest register is still on display in the main lobby, and the modern hotel still commemorates its opening every year with a New Year's Eve gala ball, voted the #1 Place to Celebrate New Year's Eve by Downtown Boulder readers.

== Architecture ==
The board of directors for Boulder's Hotel Company tasked local architecture firms to design two concepts per firm. Local architects William Redding, Floyd Redding, and James Cowie of Redding & Sons design was approved by the board of directors in 1906. The architects were inspired by Italian Renaissance and Spanish Colonial Revival-style architecture.

One of the most notable features in the Hotel Boulderado is the stained-glass ceiling of the interior lobby. The ceiling was designed to resemble that of San Francisco’s renowned Palace Hotel (Palace Hotel's stained-glass ceiling would be destroyed during the Great San Francisco Earthquake of 1906).

== Notable guests ==
- Roy Chapman Andrews
- Louis Armstrong
- Ethel Barrymore
- William Jennings Bryan
- Clarence Darrow
- Douglas Fairbanks
- Robert Frost
- Helen Keller
- Bat Masterson
- Enos Mills
- José Mojica
- Theodore Roosevelt
- John Philip Sousa
- Billy Sunday
- Thamara de Swirsky
- Thompson Twins

== See also ==
- National Register of Historic Places listings in Boulder County, Colorado
