= Kim Ransom =

American politician from Colorado

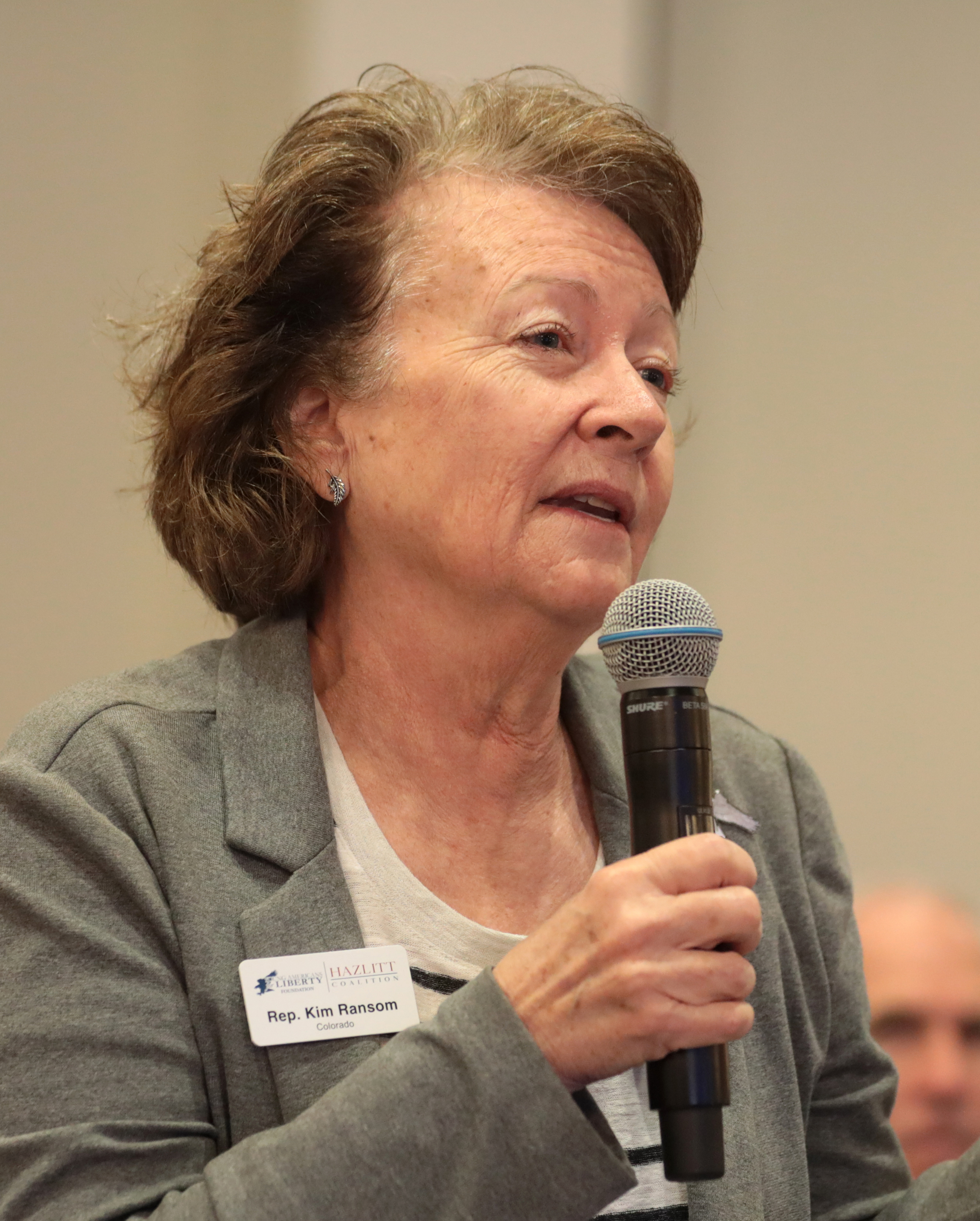
- Ransom in 2022

Member of the Colorado House of Representatives from the 44th district
- In office January 7, 2015 – January 9, 2023
- Preceded by: Chris Holbert
- Succeeded by: Anthony Hartsook

Personal details
- Party: Republican
- Education: California State University, Sacramento; California State University, Long Beach
- Profession: Legislator
- Website: www.facebook.com/Ransom4HD44/

Kim Ransom is a Colorado politician and a former member of the Colorado House of Representatives from the 44th District, which encompassed portions of northeast Douglas County, including the communities of Acres Green, Grand View Estates, Lone Tree, Meridian, Parker, and Stonegate.

Ransom, a Republican, lives in unincorporated Douglas County.

== Education and political career ==
Ransom holds two bachelor's degrees, one in communication studies and one in business administration — both from California State University, Sacramento. She also earned an MBA from California State University, Long Beach.

In the aftermath of the 2020 presidential election, on December 7, 2020, Ransom and 7 other Republicans demanded to the Speaker of the House KC Becker that a committee be formed on "election integrity" to conduct an audit of the Dominion Voting Systems used in Colorado's 2020 elections in spite of no evidence of issues. The request was rejected, with Becker criticizing it as a promotion of "debunked conspiracy theories."

== Elections ==
- 2014: Ransom became the Republican candidate after primary winner Jack Hilbert withdrew from the race to take a job with the State. She won the general election, winning 63.6% of the vote against two opponents.
- 2016: Ransom was re-elected, winning 64.64% of the vote against her Democratic opponent.
