= South Metro Fire Rescue =

American fire protection district

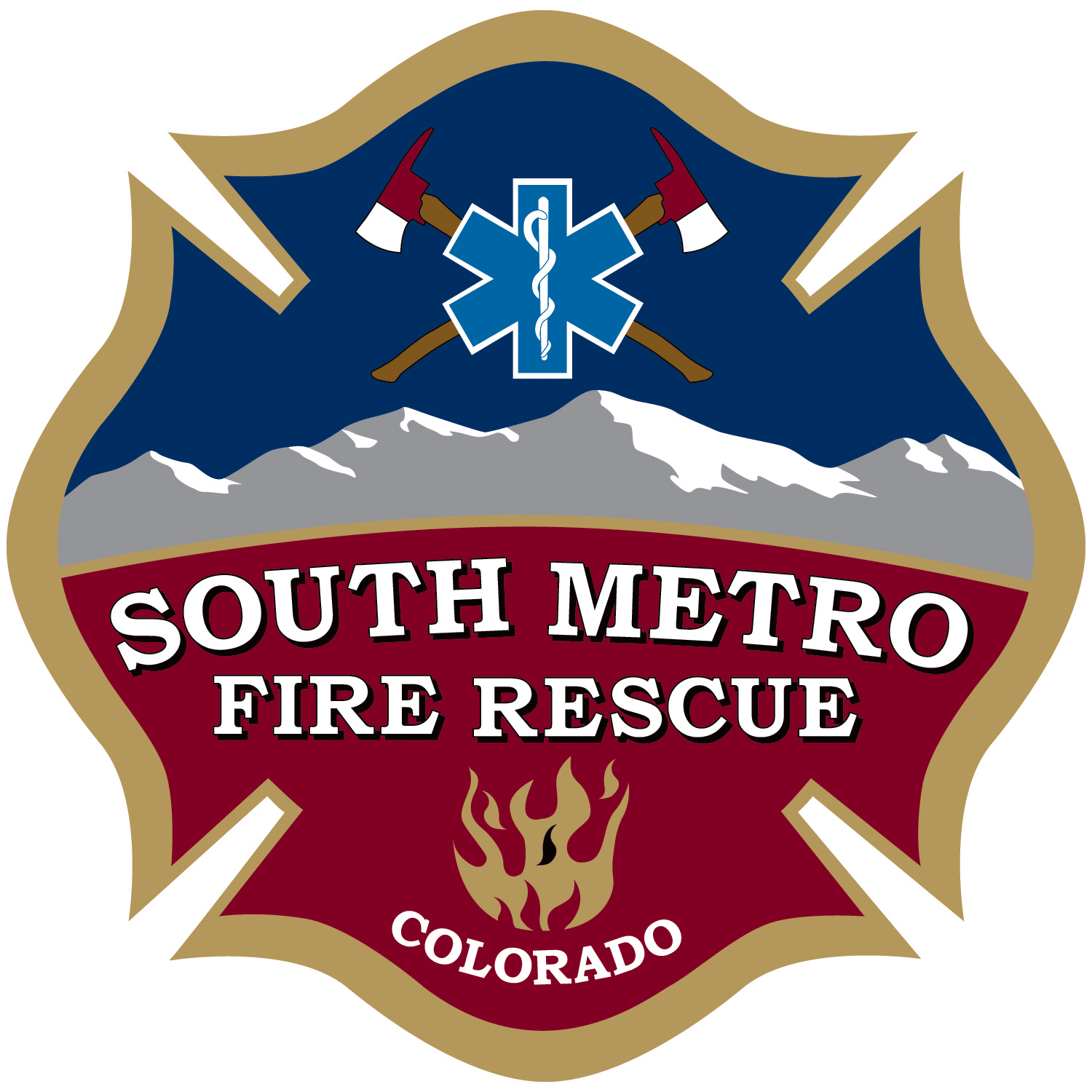

Operational area
- Country: United States
- State: Colorado
- Counties: Arapahoe, Douglas, and Jefferson counties

Agency overview
- Annual calls: 43,026 (2019)
- Employees: 725 (2020)
- Annual budget: $148,820,106 (2020)
- Staffing: Career
- Fire chief: John Curtis
- EMS level: ALS
- IAFF: 2086

Facilities and equipment
- Battalions: 5
- Stations: 30
- Engines: 23
- Tillers: 1
- Quints: 4 towers; 2 - ladders
- Rescues: 1
- Ambulances: 19
- Tenders: 6
- HAZMAT: 2
- Airport crash: 3
- Wildland: 4 Type 3; 11 Type 6
- Rescue boats: 2

Website
- Official website
- IAFF website

South Metro Fire Rescue (SMFR) is a fire protection district which provides fire protection and emergency medical services for the municipalities of Bow Mar, Castle Pines, Centennial, Cherry Hills Village, Columbine Valley, Foxfield, Greenwood Village, Littleton, Lone Tree, Parker, portions of Aurora and unincorporated portions of Arapahoe, Douglas, and Jefferson counties in Colorado. The area South Metro serves is 287 square miles (740 square kilometers) in size with a population of more than 540,000.

South Metro Fire Rescue is an internationally accredited agency with the Commission on Fire Accreditation International (CFAI) and holds an Insurance Services Office (ISO) Public Protection Classification Class 1 rating. The district operates teams specializing in aircraft rescue and firefighting, bike medics, dive rescue, hazardous materials, incident management team, SWAT medic, technical rescue, urban search and rescue, and wildland firefighting.

The district is a product of decades of consolidation between area fire departments since the 1980s including Castle Pines Fire Department, Castlewood Fire Protection District, Cherry Hills Fire Protection District, Cunningham Fire Protection District, Littleton Fire Rescue, Louviers Fire Protection District, North Douglas County Fire Protection District, and Parker Fire Protection District.

== History ==
The origins of the South Metro Fire Rescue name comes from Castlewood Fire Protection District which had petitioned to change its name to South Metro Fire Rescue on December 31, 1998. Prior to South Metro Fire Rescue, Castlewood Fire Protection District began the trend of consolidating with neighboring departments with Castle Pines Fire Department and North Douglas County Fire Protection District in 1986, and Cherry Hills Fire Protection District in 1989.

In 1999, Robert Rinne assumed the fire chief position, and Louviers Fire Protection District agreed to merge with South Metro Fire Rescue effective January 1, 2000.

On January 19, 2006, South Metro Fire Rescue established the Metropolitan Area Communications Center (MetCom) to provide dispatching service for the district. In March 2006, the district achieved international accreditation from the CFAI, a distinction held by only three other agencies in the state at the time.

In April 2007, a report was provided to the district by Emergency Services Consulting Inc. noting a consistent lack of trust between personnel and the fire chief's office and suggested a change in leadership. An example cited by the report included questioning financial decisions made in purchasing four firetrucks whereas the apparatus committee suggested only purchasing one. By June, four members of South Metro Fire Rescue's leadership, including Chief Robert Rinne, had stepped down and Fire Marshall Mike Dell'Orfano assumed the position of acting chief. In October 2007, Parker Fire Protection District Chief Dan Qualman assumed the role of interim chief of South Metro Fire Rescue as a study began on consolidating operations with Parker Fire Protection District. The study was completed in March 2008 and found that a consolidation of departments would result in tax savings and better services. The two districts voted to consolidate on April 24, 2008 and began working together on May 1, 2008 as a single authority governed by the two boards of directors, the largest merger between two entities in Colorado at the time. On January 5, 2016, Parker Fire Protection District and South Metro Fire Rescue merged into a single district.

In January 2015, Chief Dan Qualman retired and Bob Baker assumed the position of fire chief for the district.

In November 2017, South Metro Fire Rescue and Cunningham Fire Protection District agreed to form a new joint fire authority to join the two districts together effective January 1, 2018. On January 1, 2019, South Metro's authority was expanded to include areas of the Highlands Ranch Metropolitan District, Littleton Fire Protection District, and City of Littleton that were previously covered by Littleton Fire Rescue, a department with history that dates back to 1890. As a result of the expansion, South Metro became the second largest fire district in Colorado. The authority was dissolved in May 2020 after redistricting of the board of directors and subsequent election allowed for voter representation from the newly added areas.

On January 1, 2018, South Metro received an ISO Class 1 rating after previously holding a Class 3 rating, and is notable for being the first agency in the United States to achieve a Class 1 rating in areas without a fire hydrant that would require water tenders to respond.

== Stations and apparatus ==
Fire station number	Location	Engine company (Note: Staffed full-time)	Ladder company or tower company	Medic unit	Command unit	Brush unit (Note: Cross-staffed with personnel from another unit in that station)	Tender unit	Special unit	Battalion
11	2255 W Berry Ave, Littleton	Engine 11		Medic 11					2
12	6529 S Broadway, Littleton		Ladder 12	Medic 12	Battalion Chief 2			Rehab 12 (Note: Staffed when needed by Arapahoe Rescue Patrol)	2
13	6290 W Coal Mine Ave, Columbine	Engine 13		Medic 13					2
14	6600 S Colorado Blvd, Centennial	Engine 14		Medic 14					3
15	2702 E Dry Creek Rd, Centennial	Engine 15		Medic 15					2
16	8119 Blakeland Dr, Douglas County	Engine 16		Medic 16	Battalion Chief 1	Brush Engine 16			1
17	9554 S University Blvd, Highlands Ranch	Engine 17		Medic 17		Brush 17		Hazmat 17	2
18	401 Timbervale Trail, Highlands Ranch		Tower 18	Medic 18	Safety 1				1
19	8490 Trailmark Pkwy, Littleton	Engine 19						Dive 19	1
20	1801 E Wildcat Reserve Pkwy, Highlands Ranch	Engine 20				Brush Engine 20		Wildland Utility 20 (Note: Not staffed)	2
21	2250 S Emporia St, Arapahoe County	Engine 21		Medic 21; Medic 211		Brush 21			5
22	16758 E Smoky Hill Rd, Centennial	Engine 22			Battalion Chief 5	Brush 22		Fan 22 (Note: Trailer)	5
23	5405 S Riviera Way, Centennial	Engine 23		Medic 23					5
31	5901 S Havana St, Greenwood Village	Engine 31		Medic 31				Dive 31	5
32	5945 S Quebec St, Centennial		Tower 32	Medic 32	Battalion Chief 3 MED 2				3
33	7281 E Dry Creek Rd, Centennial	Engine 33		Medic 33		Brush 33			3
34	8871 Maximus Dr, Lone Tree		Ladder 34	Medic 34	District Chief 1; MED 1		Tender 34	Rescue 34	3
35	12080 E Briarwood Ave, Dove Valley		Tower 35					Red 1; Red 3; Red 4	5
36	421 E Castle Pines Pkwy, Castle Pines	Engine 36		Medic 36		Brush 36			1
37	5701 S University Blvd, Greenwood Village								3
38	2460 E Quincy Ave, Cherry Hills Village	Engine 38						Hazmat 38	3
39	475 W Happy Canyon Rd, Castle Pines Village	Engine 39				Brush Engine 39	Tender 39	Wildland Utility 39	1
40	10297 N Chatfield Dr, Douglas County	Engine 40				Brush Engine 40	Tender 40		1
41	10795 S Pine Dr, Parker	Engine 41		Medic 41	Battalion Chief 4	Brush Engine 41	Tender 41	Wildland Utility 41	4
42	7320 S Parker Rd, Foxfield	Engine 42		Medic 42		Brush 42			5
43	8165 N Pinery Pkwy, The Pinery	Engine 43				Brush 43			4
44	12625 E Lincoln Ave, Meridian	Engine 44		Medic 44	Safety 2			Red 2	4
45	16801 Northgate Dr, Stonegate		Tower 45				Tender 45	Collapse 45	4
46	19310 Stroh Rd, Parker	Engine 46		Medic 46		Brush 46	Tender 46	Foam 46	4
47	11685 Tomahawk Rd, Douglas County	Engine 47				Brush 47			4
HQ	9195 E Mineral Ave, Centennial							IDT 2IDT11	

== Notable incidents ==
- On May 7, 2019, the 2019 STEM School Highlands Ranch shooting occurred, resulting in one death and eight injuries. The initial response by South Metro Fire Rescue was upgraded to a mass casualty incident (MCI) based on information received, and included mutual aid from neighboring agencies and departments, with three medical helicopters attending. The agency notes that over 150 support personnel, ambulances, and fire apparatus responded to the incident.
