= Anthony Hartsook =

American politician

Member of the Colorado House of Representatives from the 44th district
- Incumbent
- Assumed office January 9, 2023
- Preceded by: Kim Ransom

Personal details
- Party: Republican
- Education: Northern Arizona University; Central Michigan University
- Profession: Retired Army Officer; Businessman
- Website: anthonyhartsook.com

Anthony Hartsook is a state representative from Parker, Colorado. A Republican, Hartsook represents Colorado House of Representatives District 44, which includes the Douglas County communities of Parker, Stonegate, Sierra Ridge, Meridian Village, and Stepping Stone.

== Background ==
Hartsook served for 26 years in the United States Army, retiring as a lieutenant colonel. During his service, he was deployed to both Iraq and Afghanistan. Together, He and his wife used to own and run a small business in Parker before selling Aspen Surgical Arts to a private equity firm.

== Elections ==
=== 2022 ===
In the 2022 Colorado House of Representatives election, Hartsook defeated his Democratic Party and Libertarian Party opponents, winning 57.20% of the total votes cast.

=== 2024 ===
Hartsook ran for re-election in 2024. In the Republican primary election held June 25, 2024, he ran unopposed. In the general election held November 5, 2024, Hartsook defeated his Democratic Party opponent winning 58.64% of the vote.
