= Castle Pines (unincorporated area), Colorado =

Castle Pines, Colorado
- Former Census-designated place
- Location in Douglas County and the State of Colorado
- Coordinates: 39°27′43″N 104°53′40″W
- Country: United States
- State: State of Colorado
- County: Douglas County

Government
  - Type: unincorporated community

Area
  - Total: 10.2 sq mi (26.5 km^{2})
  - Land: 10.2 sq mi (26.5 km^{2})
  - Water: 0 sq mi (0 km^{2})
- Elevation: 6,558 ft (1,999 m)

Population (2010)
  - Total: 3,614
  - Density: 582/sq mi (224.8/km^{2})
- Time zone: UTC-7 (MST)
  - Summer (DST): UTC-6 (MDT)
- ZIP code: 80108
- FIPS code: formerly 08-12387
- GNIS feature ID: formerly 1852840

Castle Pines is a former census-designated place (CDP) in Douglas County, Colorado, United States. The population was 3,614 at the 2010 census.

On November 6, 2007, the northern portion of the Castle Pines CDP was incorporated as the City of Castle Pines North and the southern portion remained as Castle Pines.

On November 2, 2010, the City of Castle Pines North rename themselves to the City of Castle Pines and the Castle Pines CDP was renamed to Castle Pines Village as a result.

== Geography ==
Castle Pines is located at 39°27′43″N 104°53′40″W.

According to the United States Census Bureau, the CDP had a total area of 10.2 square miles (26 km^{2}), all of it land.

== Demographics ==
Historical population
Census	Pop.	Note	%±
2000	5,958		—
2010	3,614		−39.3%
U.S. Decennial Census

As of the census of 2000, there were 5,958 people, 2,078 households, and 1,886 families residing in the CDP. The population density was 581.6 inhabitants per square mile (224.6/km^{2}). There were 2,223 housing units at an average density of 217.0 per square mile (83.8/km^{2}). The racial makeup of the CDP was 95.85% White, 0.89% African American, 0.34% Native American, 1.29% Asian, 0.57% from other races, and 1.06% from two or more races. Hispanic or Latino of any race were 3.16% of the population.

There were 2,078 households, out of which 44.0% had children under the age of 18 living with them, 86.5% were married couples living together, 3.0% had a female householder with no husband present, and 9.2% were non-families. 6.8% of all households were made up of individuals, and 1.0% had someone living alone who was 65 years of age or older. The average household size was 2.87 and the average family size was 3.01.

In the CDP, the population was spread out, with 29.5% under the age of 18, 2.9% from 18 to 24, 29.8% from 25 to 44, 33.5% from 45 to 64, and 4.3% who were 65 years of age or older. The median age was 40 years. For every 100 females there were 101.3 males. For every 100 females age 18 and over, there were 99.4 males.

The median income for a household in the CDP was $138,035, and the median income for a family was $140,816. Males had a median income of $93,254 versus $57,054 for females. The per capita income for the CDP was $70,456. About 0.3% of families and 0.3% of the population were below the poverty line, including none of those under the age of eighteen or sixty-five or over.

== See also ==
- Outline of Colorado
  - Index of Colorado-related articles
- State of Colorado
  - Colorado cities and towns
    - Colorado census designated places
  - Colorado counties
    - Douglas County, Colorado
  - Colorado metropolitan areas
    - Front Range Urban Corridor
    - North Central Colorado Urban Area
    - Denver-Aurora-Boulder, CO Combined Statistical Area
    - Denver-Aurora-Broomfield, CO Metropolitan Statistical Area
