= Rueter–Hess Reservoir =

Rueter-Hess Reservoir
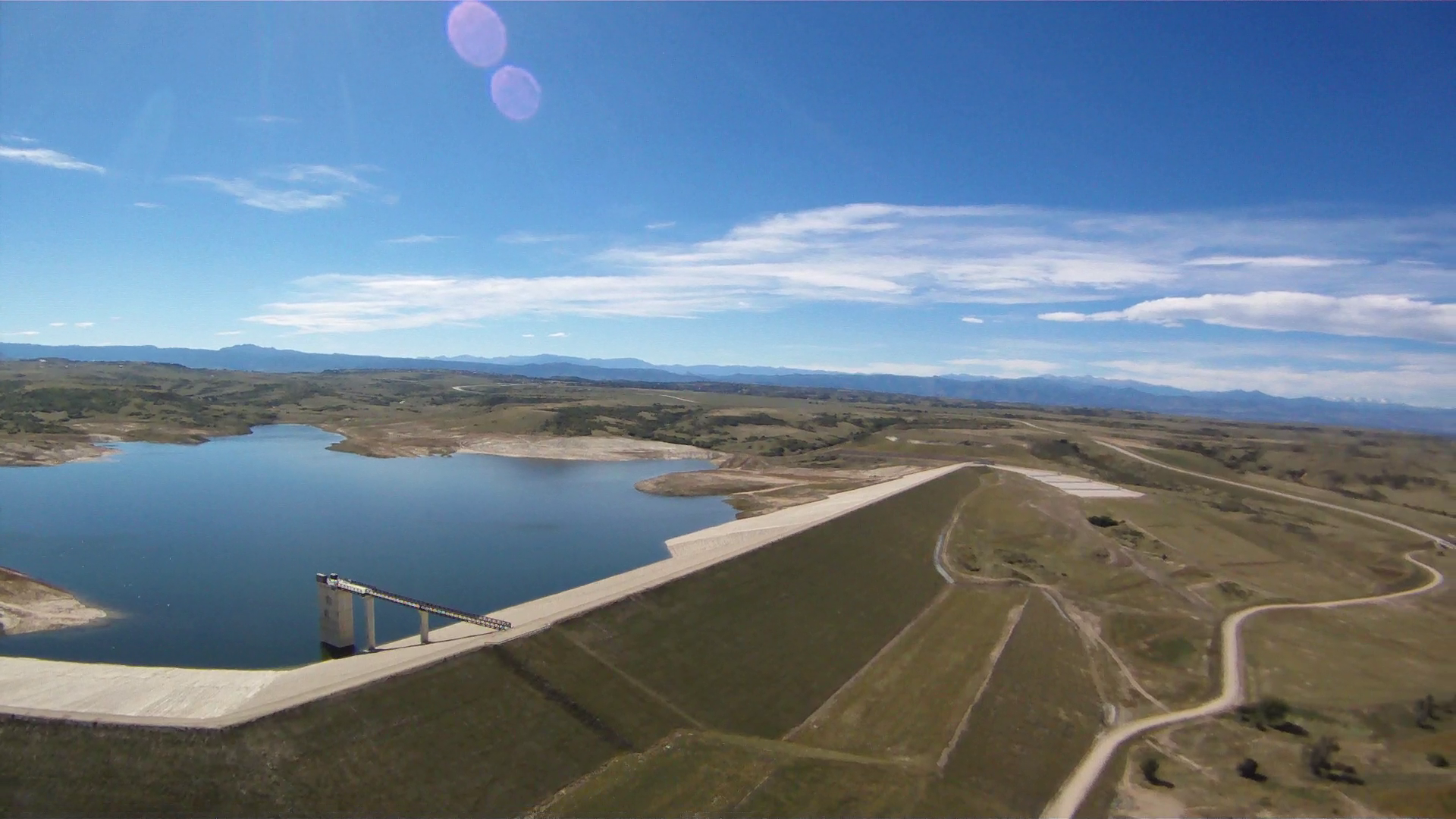
- Aerial view of the Frank Jaeger dam and Rueter-Hess reservoir in September 2013, captured by a radio-controlled airplane

- Location within Colorado Location within the United States
- Location: Douglas County, Colorado
- Coordinates: 39°29′20″N 104°49′30″W
- Type: Reservoir
- Primary inflows: Cherry Creek (pumped)
- Primary outflows: Newlin Gulch
- Basin countries: United States
- Managing agency: Parker Water and Sanitation District
- Built: 2005
- First flooded: 2012
- Max. length: 1.0 mi (1.6 km)
- Max. width: 0.75 mi (1.21 km)
- Surface area: 1,170 acres (4.7 km^{2})
- Max. depth: 184 feet (56 m)
- Water volume: 75,000 acre⋅ft (93×10^{6} m^{3})
- Surface elevation: 6,152 ft (1,875 m)

The Rueter–Hess Reservoir, behind the Frank Jaeger Dam, is a major water management project for the Parker Water and Sanitation District PWSD. PWSD provides services for most of Parker and parts of Lone Tree, Castle Pines, and unincorporated Douglas County, Colorado. Originally an enterprise of the Town of Parker, PWSD is now an unaffiliated special District.

The PWSD Board views the reservoir as a "Regional" asset. The District has collaborated with other South Metro water districts to acquire intermittent available water under the WISE agreement in conjunction with Denver/Aurora. Rueter-Hess is the vessel to hold excess flows.

== Location ==
The reservoir is located in a gulch named Newlin Gulch just southwest of Parker and east of Castle Pines North. It is visible looking east from I-25 when south of the Castle Pines Pkwy/Hess Road exit.

== History of the project ==
The origins of the Rueter–Hess project began over 20 years ago, long before the town of Parker became the vibrant suburban-Denver community that it is today. The owner of the project is Parker Water and Sanitation District (PWSD) (a special District unaffiliated with the Town of Parker) . PWSD was formed in 1962 and incorporated in 1981 at a time when the population of Parker was 285. As the town grew, slowly at first, the need for water was recognized. March 20, 1985 marks the date when a water right was legally conveyed to PWSD to divert Cherry Creek water. It is this decree that would eventually permit PWSD to divert surface waters and alluvial groundwater from Cherry Creek to the Rueter–Hess Reservoir.

=== Site selection ===
Other locations had been considered for the reservoir and dam prior to a final determination. By December, 1991 after further water studies, PWSD determined, "...that the Castlewood Canyon site [south of Parker] was the most favorable location for upstream water storage and, therefore, the two additional sites were dropped from the Water Court application. Therefore, PWSD continued with plans for building the dam and 600-acre (2.4 km^{2}) reservoir at Castlewood Canyon State Park (Ciruli and Associates, 1999)." The reservoir "would flood much of the state park and the cattle operations on historic ranches nearby (McKibben, 1991)."

=== Legal battle ===
In early 1993, PWSD and the town of Parker became involved as plaintiffs in a civil court action to appropriate the state land comprising the Castlewood Canyon State Park needed for the dam and reservoir. The town and PWSD had petitioned to condemn certain property owned by the state in order to determine the feasibility of recreation and a water storage project on the state park land. The District Court of Douglas County had found for the state dismissing the petition from PWSD on the grounds that the town and district did not have authority to condemn state-owned lands. The town and PWSD appealed. On March 11, 1993, the Colorado Court of Appeals issued a decision in Town of Parker & Parker Water and Sanitation District v. The Colorado Division of Parks and Outdoor Recreation. No. 92CA0494. The appellate court also found for the state.

The town of Parker and PWSD decided they would continue with their legal options to the Colorado Supreme Court. Consequently, in June, 1993, PWSD filed a motion in Division 1 Water Court to add two alternate sites for the dam and reservoir in the event that any further civil actions remained unsuccessful in the attempt to condemn state land for the state park site. One alternate site was located on a tributary of Cherry Creek just upstream of Castlewood Canyon State Park; the other, to be located in Newlin Gulch southwest of Parker. This second alternate site was to eventually become the site of the Rueter–Hess dam and reservoir.

On November 1, 1993, the Supreme Court of Colorado upheld the decision of the district and appellate courts in Town of Parker & Parker Water and Sanitation District v. The Colorado Division of Parks and Outdoor Recreation. No. 93SC301. The high court had once again found for the state.

=== Naming ===
The Newlin Gulch site was the home of several long time ranchers, including the Rueter and Hess families. The Parker Water & Sanitation District needed to purchase Ms. Rosie (Rueter) Hess's property. One of her conditions of sale was the naming of the reservoir after both her married and maiden names.

=== Construction ===
Ground was broken for a 17,000 acre feet project 2004. The entire project was planned to be completed in late 2007 at a cost of over $120 million. When initial construction was nearly complete, other water districts joined the project and funded expansion to 72,000 acre feet (75,000 as built). Final completion was in 2012 at a total cost of around $170 million not including land, capitalized interest and other per-construction costs.

=== Water flows ===
A moist 2013, 2014 and first half 2015 in Colorado resulted in a free stream much of the time since then. Free stream conditions combined with return flows resulted in routine 25 to 30 acre feet of water a day being pumped to the reservoir by the three megawatt pumping station at Cherry Creek.

As of July 2017, the reservoir was about 38% full, containing over 27,600 acre feet of water, more than three times the current annual demand of PWSD. Considering that PWSD operates a Reuse paradigm, in reality this represents enough water for the district for nearly 6 years.

=== Treatment plant ===
In July 2015 a ceramic membrane water treatment plant returning Rueter-Hess water to PWSD potable water lines came on-line. The plant has a capacity of 10 million gallons per day, although demand in 2015 was around 2 million gallons per day, giving the plant capacity for the rapid growth of the Parker area.

== Primary purpose ==
The primary function of the reservoir is to minimize draws of deep groundwater or bedrock aquifer from the Denver Basin that are not renewable. The project was designed to capture water when available for times it isn't and recycle processed return flows, thereby reducing reliance on groundwater.

=== Water sources ===
Rueter–Hess Reservoir is an off-stream reservoir which requires pumping surface water from nearby Cherry Creek, return flows from PWSD and other water districts. Additionally there are minor natural flows from Newlin Gulch above the reservoir.

Cherry Creek water is obtained from a diversion dam ("N+104°46'06.1"W 39°28'21.9"N 104°46'06.1"W), large wet well, and pumping station ("N 104°46'10.6"W 39°28'21.1"N 104°46'10.6"W), all located on Cherry Creek just south of Stroh Road and adjacent to the Cherry Creek Regional Trail in Parker, CO. The facilities are located about 3/4 mile downstream from the Pinery Waste Water Treatment Plant (WWTP)(39.4668021,-104.7726352).

== Capacity ==
The reservoir has an as-built capacity of 75,000 acre-feet. For comparison, nearby Cherry Creek Reservoir normally contains 13,500 acre feet (against the maximum capacity of 134,470 acre feet), and Chatfield Reservoir normally holds 27,076 acre feet (against the maximum capacity of 355,000 acre feet). The reason for the dramatic difference between the normal capacity and the maximum capacity of the nearby reservoirs is due to their primary purpose being flood control, rather than storage.

== Communities Served ==
The reservoir serves PWSD customers (approx. 25,000 residents/customers) and partner communities of Castle Rock (8,000 Ac. Ft., contributed $44 million and has 44,000 customers), Castle Pines North (1,500 Ac. Ft., $8.25M, 3,200 customers) and Stonegate (1,200 Ac. Ft., $6.6M, 2,700 customers).

== Recreation ==
In August 2015 PWSD consummated an agreement with Castle Pines, Castle Rock, Lone Tree, Parker and Douglas County which formed the Rueter-Hess Recreation Authority (RHRA). The recreation authority oversees the area directly around the reservoir and also owns 424 acres just north for future recreational development. RHRA has planned for public boating, fishing, swimming, and hiking on and along the reservoir, with the first trails completed and opened in November 2020. As of 2023, the reservoir is open for public recreational catch and release fishing and non-motorized boating.
