= Cottonwood, Colorado =

Neighborhood in Parker, Colorado, USA

Cottonwood, Parker
- Neighborhood
- Location of Cottonwood in Douglas County, Colorado
- Coordinates: 39°33′45″N 104°48′07″W
- Country: United States
- State: Colorado
- County: Douglas County
- County: Town of Parker
- Elevation: 5,752 ft (1,753 m)

Population (2000)
  - Total: 931
- Time zone: UTC-7 (MST)
  - Summer (DST): UTC-6 (MDT)
- Area codes: 303 & 720
- GNIS feature ID: 1852842

Cottonwood is a neighborhood in Parker, Colorado. A former census-designated place (CDP), the population was 931 at the 2000 census.

== Climate ==
This climate type is usually found in the outskirts of true deserts in low-latitude, semiarid regions. It has a cooler, wetter winter resulting from the higher latitude and mid-latitude frontal cyclone activity. Annual precipitation totals are greater than in tropical and subtropical desert climates. Yearly variations in amount are not as extreme as in the true deserts but are nevertheless large. The Köppen Climate Classification subtype for this climate is "BSk". (Tropical and Subtropical Steppe Climate).

Climate data for Cottonwood, Colorado
Month	Jan	Feb	Mar	Apr	May	Jun	Jul	Aug	Sep	Oct	Nov	Dec	Year
Mean daily maximum °F (°C)	43 (6)	46 (8)	51 (11)	60 (16)	69 (21)	80 (27)	86 (30)	84 (29)	77 (25)	66 (19)	52 (11)	45 (7)	63 (17)
Mean daily minimum °F (°C)	15 (−9)	18 (−8)	23 (−5)	31 (−1)	40 (4)	49 (9)	55 (13)	54 (12)	46 (8)	35 (2)	23 (−5)	17 (−8)	34 (1)
Average precipitation inches (mm)	0.3 (7.6)	0.3 (7.6)	0.9 (23)	1.3 (33)	2.5 (64)	1.9 (48)	2.2 (56)	1.9 (48)	1.1 (28)	0.8 (20)	0.7 (18)	0.3 (7.6)	14.1 (360)
Source: Weatherbase

== See also ==
- Denver-Aurora-Boulder, CO Combined Statistical Area
- Denver-Aurora-Broomfield, CO Metropolitan Statistical Area
