= Sterling Ranch, Colorado =

Unincorporated community in Douglas County, CO, USA

- Census-designated place
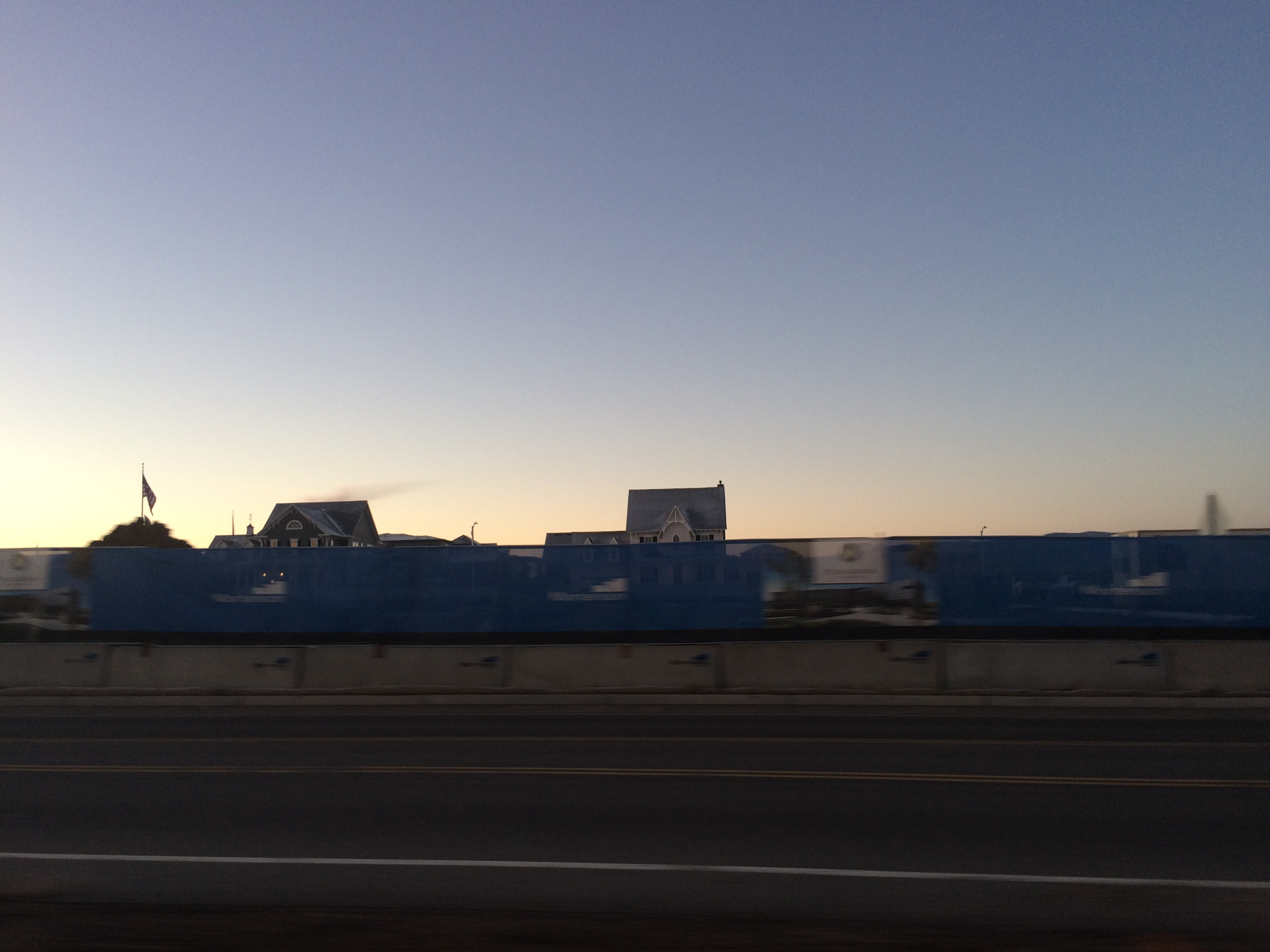
- Sterling Ranch

- Location of the Sterling Ranch CDP in the State of Colorado
- Coordinates: 39°30′05″N 105°02′45″W
- Country: United States
- State: Colorado
- County: Douglas County

Government
  - Type: unincorporated community

Area
  - Total: 5.529 sq mi (14.320 km^{2})
  - Land: 5.529 sq mi (14.320 km^{2})
  - Water: 0 sq mi (0.000 km^{2})
- Elevation: 5,709 ft (1,740 m)

Population (2020)
  - Total: 1,789
  - Density: 323.6/sq mi (124.9/km^{2})
- Time zone: UTC-7 (MST)
  - Summer (DST): UTC-6 (MDT)
- ZIP Code: Littleton 80125
- Area codes: 303 & 720
- GNIS feature ID: 2805917

Sterling Ranch is an unincorporated community and a census-designated place (CDP) located in and governed by Douglas County, Colorado, United States. The population was 1,789 at the 2020 census. The CDP is a part of the Denver–Aurora–Lakewood, CO Metropolitan Statistical Area. Douglas County governs the unincorporated community and the Sterling Ranch Community Authority Board provides services through several metropolitan districts. The Littleton post office (Zip Code 80125) serves the area.

== History ==
Construction of Sterling Ranch development began in early 2016, with eight builders offering single-family homes. The development comprises 3,400 acres and was to eventually house 33,000 residents. The full buildout for the community is projected to take 20 years and will include nine villages with a town center.

Sterling Ranch will include 30 miles of internal trails connecting to Chatfield State Park and Roxborough State Park and three regional parks. Nearly 40 percent of Sterling Ranch will remain open space, including two wildlife corridors.

Providence Village, the first of the nine villages in the development, consists of just under 800 homes, a recreation center, church, school, civic center, and several parks.

== Geography ==
The Sterling Ranch CDP has an area of 3,539 acres (14.320 km^{2}), all land.

== Demographics ==
The United States Census Bureau first defined the Sterling Ranch CDP for the 2020 census.

Sterling Ranch CDP, Colorado
Year	Pop.	±%
2020	1,789	—
Source: United States Census Bureau

=== 2020 census ===
As of the 2020 census, Sterling Ranch had a population of 1,789. The median age was 35.5 years. 29.3% of residents were under the age of 18 and 7.2% of residents were 65 years of age or older. For every 100 females there were 101.0 males, and for every 100 females age 18 and over there were 102.7 males age 18 and over.

0.0% of residents lived in urban areas, while 100.0% lived in rural areas.

There were 580 households in Sterling Ranch, of which 50.0% had children under the age of 18 living in them. Of all households, 77.9% were married-couple households, 8.4% were households with a male householder and no spouse or partner present, and 7.9% were households with a female householder and no spouse or partner present. About 9.7% of all households were made up of individuals and 2.4% had someone living alone who was 65 years of age or older.

There were 685 housing units, of which 15.3% were vacant. The homeowner vacancy rate was 9.4% and the rental vacancy rate was 28.6%.

Racial composition as of the 2020 census
Race	Number	Percent
White	1,444	80.7%
Black or African American	16	0.9%
American Indian and Alaska Native	6	0.3%
Asian	101	5.6%
Native Hawaiian and Other Pacific Islander	1	0.1%
Some other race	30	1.7%
Two or more races	191	10.7%
Hispanic or Latino (of any race)	185	10.3%

== Education ==
The Douglas County School District RE-1 serves Sterling Ranch.

== Water ==
Sterling Ranch is served by the Dominion Water and Sanitation District, which was building a water system with a water treatment facility on Sterling Ranch.

== Technology ==
Sterling Ranch is Colorado’s first 1 Gig community. Every home has fiber optic lines running directly to it.

== See also ==
- Denver-Aurora-Boulder, CO Combined Statistical Area
- Denver-Aurora-Broomfield, CO Metropolitan Statistical Area
