= Meridian Village, Colorado =

Unincorporated community in Douglas County, CO, USA

- Census-designated place
- Location of the Meridian Village CDP in the State of Colorado
- Coordinates: 39°31′41″N 104°49′33″W
- Country: United States
- State: Colorado
- County: Douglas County

Government
  - Type: unincorporated community

Area
  - Total: 2.563 sq mi (6.639 km^{2})
  - Land: 2.563 sq mi (6.639 km^{2})
  - Water: 0 sq mi (0.000 km^{2})
- Elevation: 5,935 ft (1,809 m)

Population (2020)
  - Total: 3,202
  - Density: 1,249/sq mi (482.3/km^{2})
- Time zone: UTC-7 (MST)
  - Summer (DST): UTC-6 (MDT)
- ZIP Code: 80134
- Area codes: 303 & 720
- GNIS feature ID: 2805911

Meridian Village is an unincorporated community and a census-designated place (CDP) located in and governed by Douglas County, Colorado, United States. The population was 3,202 at the 2020 census. The CDP is a part of the Denver–Aurora–Lakewood, CO Metropolitan Statistical Area. The Meridian Metropolitan District provides services to the area, which lies in ZIP code 80134.

== Geography ==
The Meridian Village CDP has an area of 1,641 acres (6.639 km^{2}), all land.

== Demographics ==
The United States Census Bureau defined the Meridian Village CDP for the United States Census 2020.

Meridian Village CDP, Colorado
Year	Pop.	±%
2020	3,202	—
Source: United States Census Bureau

=== 2020 census ===
As of the 2020 census, Meridian Village had a population of 3,202. The median age was 35.9 years. 33.0% of residents were under the age of 18 and 6.7% of residents were 65 years of age or older. For every 100 females there were 97.3 males, and for every 100 females age 18 and over there were 95.4 males age 18 and over.

100.0% of residents lived in urban areas, while 0.0% lived in rural areas.

There were 1,057 households in Meridian Village, of which 51.5% had children under the age of 18 living in them. Of all households, 74.3% were married-couple households, 7.8% were households with a male householder and no spouse or partner present, and 13.6% were households with a female householder and no spouse or partner present. About 10.4% of all households were made up of individuals and 2.6% had someone living alone who was 65 years of age or older.

There were 1,075 housing units, of which 1.7% were vacant. The homeowner vacancy rate was 0.8% and the rental vacancy rate was 6.0%.

Racial composition as of the 2020 census
Race	Number	Percent
White	2,313	72.2%
Black or African American	48	1.5%
American Indian and Alaska Native	5	0.2%
Asian	526	16.4%
Native Hawaiian and Other Pacific Islander	0	0.0%
Some other race	62	1.9%
Two or more races	248	7.7%
Hispanic or Latino (of any race)	227	7.1%

== Education ==
The Douglas County School District RE-1 serves Meridian Village.

== See also ==
- Denver-Aurora-Boulder, CO Combined Statistical Area
- Denver-Aurora-Broomfield, CO Metropolitan Statistical Area
