= Sierra Ridge, Colorado =

Unincorporated community in Douglas County, CO, USA

- Census-designated place
- Location of the Sierra Ridge CDP in the State of Colorado
- Coordinates: 39°31′43″N 104°49′02″W
- Country: United States
- State: Colorado
- County: Douglas County

Government
  - Type: unincorporated community

Area
  - Total: 0.506 sq mi (1.311 km^{2})
  - Land: 0.506 sq mi (1.311 km^{2})
  - Water: 0 sq mi (0.000 km^{2})
- Elevation: 5,952 ft (1,814 m)

Population (2020)
  - Total: 3,490
- Time zone: UTC−7 (MST)
  - Summer (DST): UTC−6 (MDT)
- ZIP Code: 80134
- Area codes: 303 & 720
- GNIS feature ID: 2805913

Sierra Ridge is an unincorporated community and a census-designated place (CDP) located in and governed by Douglas County, Colorado, United States. The population was 3,490 at the 2020 census. The CDP is a part of the Denver–Aurora–Lakewood, CO Metropolitan Statistical Area. The unincorporated community lies in ZIP Code 80134.

== Geography ==
The Sierra Ridge CDP has an area of 324 acres (1.311 km^{2}), all land.

== Demographics ==
The United States Census Bureau defined the Sierra Ridge CDP for the United States Census 2020.

Sierra Ridge CDP, Colorado
Year	Pop.	±%
2020	3,490	—
Source: United States Census Bureau

=== 2020 census ===
As of the 2020 census, Sierra Ridge had a population of 3,490. The median age was 33.4 years. 34.7% of residents were under the age of 18 and 7.5% of residents were 65 years of age or older. For every 100 females there were 88.2 males, and for every 100 females age 18 and over there were 83.4 males age 18 and over.

100.0% of residents lived in urban areas, while 0.0% lived in rural areas.

There were 1,124 households in Sierra Ridge, of which 61.2% had children under the age of 18 living in them. Of all households, 65.2% were married-couple households, 10.9% were households with a male householder and no spouse or partner present, and 20.3% were households with a female householder and no spouse or partner present. About 14.7% of all households were made up of individuals and 3.6% had someone living alone who was 65 years of age or older.

There were 1,149 housing units, of which 2.2% were vacant. The homeowner vacancy rate was 1.2% and the rental vacancy rate was 2.4%.

Racial composition as of the 2020 census
Race	Number	Percent
White	2,006	57.5%
Black or African American	97	2.8%
American Indian and Alaska Native	33	0.9%
Asian	959	27.5%
Native Hawaiian and Other Pacific Islander	1	0.0%
Some other race	93	2.7%
Two or more races	301	8.6%
Hispanic or Latino (of any race)	342	9.8%

== Education ==
The Douglas County School District RE-1 serves Sierra Ridge.

== See also ==
- Denver-Aurora-Boulder, CO Combined Statistical Area
- Denver-Aurora-Broomfield, CO Metropolitan Statistical Area
