= Douglas County search and rescue =

All-volunteer organization in Colorado

Douglas County Sheriff's Office Search & Rescue Team, Inc.
- Douglas County Sheriff's Office Search & Rescue Team logo
- Active: 1998 - Present
- Type: All volunteer, SAR, MRA unit. 501(c)(3) Non-Profit
- Role: Search and Rescue and MRA
- Size: 53 active members
- Part of: Douglas County Colorado Sheriff's Office
- Garrison/HQ: (United States) Castle Rock, CO
- Nickname: DCSARCO
- Mottos: Safety, Leadership and Commitment
- Colors: Black and Yellow
- Website: http://www.dcsarco.org/

Douglas County Search and Rescue is an all-volunteer organization in Douglas County within Douglas County Sheriff's Office. With approximately sixty active members year-round, Douglas County's Search and Rescue (Douglas SAR) responds to searches for missing children and adults, evidence and other search requests in the county and on mutual aid calls anywhere in the state of Colorado. Douglas SAR is a mountain rescue Type I certified team able to handle the toughest terrain and remain out in the field without resupply for extended periods.

== History ==
Today the team, headquartered in Castle Rock, CO at 13S 511170 4362088 UTM, trains and is equipped to respond to sustained wilderness and high altitude searches, lost/missing/injured person searches, mass casualty incidents or natural disasters as well as Urban Search and Rescue (US&R).

Douglas SAR recruits new members once a year and no prior MRA or SAR experience is required.

== Operations ==
Due to the diverse geography of Douglas County, its proximity to major population centers, and natural tourist attractions, Douglas County's SAR team operates closely with multiple local, state and federal agencies. Based on request and activation by the Douglas County (CO) Sheriff's Office and the Colorado Search and Rescue Association (CRSB) (responsible for mutual-aid coordination within the State), the team will deploy anywhere, anytime in support of missions within other counties. The team operates under a Memorandum of Understanding with the Douglas County (CO) Sheriff's Office.

== Resources ==
Douglas SAR has the ability to field one mobile incident command vehicle, three rescue vehicles, a drone truck designed for self-sustained UAV operations, plus multiple ATVs, trailers, and snowmobiles.

== See also ==
- Mountain Rescue
- Mountain Rescue Association
- Search and Rescue
- Wilderness First Aid
- Wilderness First Responder (WFR)
- Wilderness Emergency Medical Technician (WEMT)
