= Acres Green, Colorado =

Unincorporated community in Colorado, US

- Census-designated place
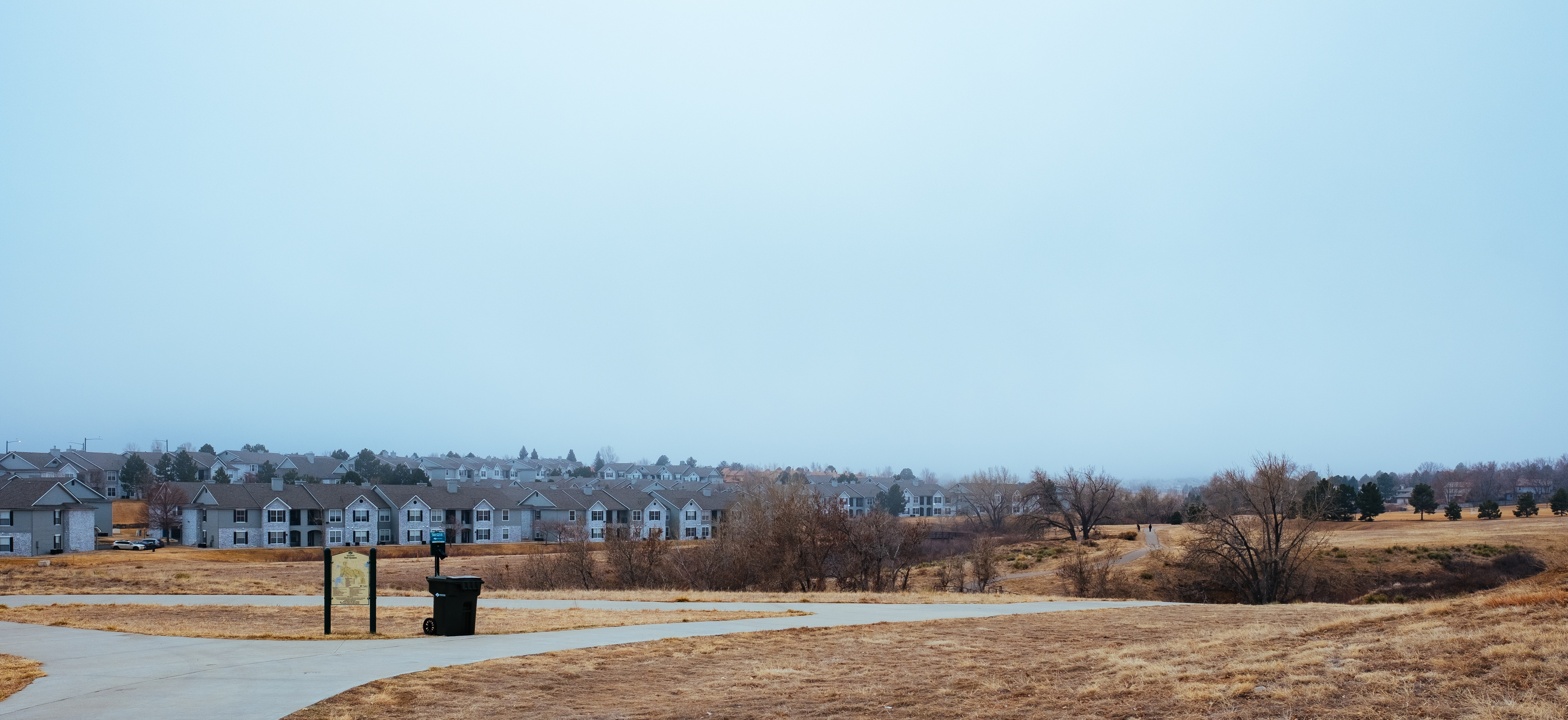
- Acres Green from Sweetwater Park

- Location of the Acres Green CDP in Douglas County, Colorado
- Coordinates: 39°33′21″N 104°53′45″W
- Country: United States
- State: Colorado
- County: Douglas

Government
  - Type: Unincorporated community
  - Body: Douglas County

Area
  - Total: 0.60 sq mi (1.56 km^{2})
  - Land: 0.60 sq mi (1.56 km^{2})
  - Water: 0 sq mi (0.00 km^{2})
- Elevation: 5,834 ft (1,778 m)

Population (2020)
  - Total: 2,922
  - Density: 4,850/sq mi (1,870/km^{2})
- Time zone: UTC−07:00 (MST)
  - Summer (DST): UTC−06:00 (MDT)
- ZIP Code: 80124
- Area codes: 303/720/983
- GNIS CDP ID: 2407696
- FIPS code: FIPS 08 00320

Acres Green is an unincorporated community and a census-designated place (CDP) located in Douglas County, Colorado, United States. The CDP is a part of the Denver–Aurora–Lakewood, CO Metropolitan Statistical Area. The population of the Acres Green CDP was 2,922 at the 2020 United States census. It is bordered by Lone Tree to the north, east and south and Highlands Ranch to the west. The community lies in ZIP Code 80124.

== History ==
The Acres Green subdivision was built by the Morris General contractors with construction beginning on a former pasture south of County Line Road near Interstate 25 in 1971

This was the first housing development in northern Douglas County. Construction on the sixth and final filling would be completed 12 years later.

The subdivision was being built up as Denver began to prosper with an economic boom because of the energy industry. Although the subdivision is about 20 miles (32 km) from downtown, the Denver Technological Center was growing a few miles to the north along I-25 while the Inverness office complex just to the east of the interstate was in its infancy. By the time of the late 1970s, the subdivision contained a park, elementary school and library.

As Denver grew to the south along the I-25 corridor during this time, there was a need for additional housing. However, the area around the Acres Green community would remain largely isolated for many years. The nearest development was in southern Arapahoe County was over two miles (3.2 km) north of Acres Green until development extended south to County Line Road in the early-1980s. The majority of Acres Green was complete before the Highlands Ranch community had even begun to the west around the same time. Development of that community would not reach the area west Acres Green until the early-1990s. The SH 470 highway was built between the homes of Acres Green and County Line Road in the mid-1980s. The library, which was built in 1979 was leveled because it stood in the path of the highway.

In the mid-1990s, Denver began another economic boom because of the technology industry. As the decade progressed, the long-time empty land around the Acres Green began to disappear. The Meridian office complex was developed to the southeast. Also, the Park Meadows shopping mall spurred large scale retail development all around the development. Many other subdivisions were built to the south of Acres Green which became known as Lone Tree.

During 1995 the city of Lone Tree incorporated, nearly surrounding the community. Homeowners voted against annexation and today still remain an unincorporated area of Douglas County.

== Demographics ==
The United States Census Bureau initially defined the Acres Green CDP for the 2000 United States census.

Acres Green CDP, Colorado
| Year | Pop. | ±% |
|---|---|---|
| 2000 | 3,205 | — |
| 2010 | 3,007 | −6.2% |
| 2020 | 2,922 | −2.8% |
Source: United States Census Bureau

=== 2020 census ===
As of the 2020 census, Acres Green had a population of 2,922. The median age was 40.0 years. 22.0% of residents were under the age of 18 and 15.5% of residents were 65 years of age or older. For every 100 females there were 104.6 males, and for every 100 females age 18 and over there were 107.5 males age 18 and over.

100.0% of residents lived in urban areas, while 0.0% lived in rural areas.

There were 1,036 households in Acres Green, of which 32.4% had children under the age of 18 living in them. Of all households, 58.9% were married-couple households, 18.7% were households with a male householder and no spouse or partner present, and 17.9% were households with a female householder and no spouse or partner present. About 18.2% of all households were made up of individuals and 7.1% had someone living alone who was 65 years of age or older.

There were 1,059 housing units, of which 2.2% were vacant. The homeowner vacancy rate was 0.4% and the rental vacancy rate was 8.2%.

Racial composition as of the 2020 census
| Race | Number | Percent |
|---|---|---|
| White | 2,288 | 78.3% |
| Black or African American | 33 | 1.1% |
| American Indian and Alaska Native | 43 | 1.5% |
| Asian | 79 | 2.7% |
| Native Hawaiian and Other Pacific Islander | 3 | 0.1% |
| Some other race | 125 | 4.3% |
| Two or more races | 351 | 12.0% |
| Hispanic or Latino (of any race) | 414 | 14.2% |

== Education ==
The Douglas County School District serves Acres Green.

== See also ==
- Denver–Aurora–Lakewood, CO Metropolitan Statistical Area
- Front Range Urban Corridor
