= Grand View Estates, Colorado =

Unincorporated community in Douglas County, CO, USA

- Census-designated place
- Location of the Grand View Estates CDP in Douglas County, Colorado
- Coordinates: 39°32′38″N 104°49′15″W
- Country: United States
- State: Colorado
- County: Douglas County

Government
  - Type: unincorporated community

Area
  - Total: 1.017 sq mi (2.635 km^{2})
  - Land: 0.998 sq mi (2.584 km^{2})
  - Water: 0.020 sq mi (0.051 km^{2})
- Elevation: 5,811 ft (1,771 m)

Population (2020)
  - Total: 689
  - Density: 691/sq mi (267/km^{2})
- Time zone: UTC-7 (MST)
  - Summer (DST): UTC-6 (MDT)
- ZIP Code: 80134
- Area codes: 303 & 720
- GNIS feature ID: 2408317

Grand View Estates is an unincorporated community and a Census-designated place (CDP) located in and governed by Douglas County, Colorado, United States. The CDP is a part of the Denver–Aurora–Lakewood, CO Metropolitan Statistical Area. The population of the Grand View Estates CDP was 689 at the United States Census 2020. The area lies in ZIP code 80134.

== Geography ==
Grand View Estates is located in northern Douglas County between Stonegate and Parker to the east and Lone Tree to the west. It is just south of Exits 2 and 3 on the E-470 toll highway and is 20 miles (32 km) south of downtown Denver.

The Grand View Estates CDP has an area of 651 acres (2.635 km^{2}), including 13 acres (0.051 km^{2}) of water.

== Demographics ==
The United States Census Bureau initially defined the Grand View Estates CDP for the United States Census 2000.

Grand View Estates CDP, Colorado
Year	Pop.	±%
2000	691	—
2010	528	−23.6%
2020	689	+30.5%
Source: United States Census Bureau

== Education ==
The Douglas County School District serves Grand View Estates.

== See also ==
- Denver-Aurora-Boulder, CO Combined Statistical Area
- Denver-Aurora-Broomfield, CO Metropolitan Statistical Area
