= Stepping Stone, Colorado =

Unincorporated community in Douglas County, CO, USA

- Census-designated place
- Location of the Stepping Stone CDP in the State of Colorado
- Coordinates: 39°30′51″N 104°49′18″W
- Country: United States
- State: Colorado
- County: Douglas County

Government
  - Type: Unincorporated community

Area
  - Total: 0.758 sq mi (1.962 km^{2})
  - Land: 0.737 sq mi (1.908 km^{2})
  - Water: 0.021 sq mi (0.054 km^{2})
- Elevation: 6,011 ft (1,832 m)

Population (2020)
  - Total: 2,780
  - Density: 3,770/sq mi (1,460/km^{2})
- Time zone: UTC-7 (MST)
  - Summer (DST): UTC-6 (MDT)
- ZIP Code: 80134
- Area codes: 303 & 720
- GNIS feature ID: 2805915

Stepping Stone is an unincorporated community and a census-designated place (CDP) located in and governed by Douglas County, Colorado, United States. The population was 2,780 at the 2020 census. The CDP is a part of the Denver–Aurora–Lakewood, CO Metropolitan Statistical Area. The unincorporated community lies in ZIP code 80134.

== Geography ==
The Stepping Stone CDP has an area of 485 acres (1.962 km^{2}), including 13 acres (0.054 km^{2}) of water.

== Demographics ==
The United States Census Bureau defined the Stepping Stone CDP for the United States Census 2020.

Stepping Stone CDP, Colorado
Year	Pop.	±%
2020	2,780	—
Source: United States Census Bureau

=== 2020 census ===
As of the 2020 census, Stepping Stone had a population of 2,780. The median age was 33.8 years. 35.5% of residents were under the age of 18 and 4.7% of residents were 65 years of age or older. For every 100 females there were 101.4 males, and for every 100 females age 18 and over there were 99.6 males age 18 and over.

100.0% of residents lived in urban areas, while 0.0% lived in rural areas.

There were 857 households in Stepping Stone, of which 62.2% had children under the age of 18 living in them. Of all households, 83.9% were married-couple households, 6.7% were households with a male householder and no spouse or partner present, and 6.1% were households with a female householder and no spouse or partner present. About 6.9% of all households were made up of individuals and 1.3% had someone living alone who was 65 years of age or older.

There were 874 housing units, of which 1.9% were vacant. The homeowner vacancy rate was 0.6% and the rental vacancy rate was 2.2%.

Racial composition as of the 2020 census
Race	Number	Percent
White	1,894	68.1%
Black or African American	16	0.6%
American Indian and Alaska Native	5	0.2%
Asian	576	20.7%
Native Hawaiian and Other Pacific Islander	1	0.0%
Some other race	35	1.3%
Two or more races	253	9.1%
Hispanic or Latino (of any race)	176	6.3%

== Education ==
The Douglas County School District serves Stepping Stone.

== See also ==
- Denver-Aurora-Boulder, CO Combined Statistical Area
- Denver-Aurora-Broomfield, CO Metropolitan Statistical Area
