= Castle Pines Village, Colorado =

Census-designated place in Douglas County, CO, USA

Castle Pines Village, Colorado The Village at Castle Pines
- Census-designated place
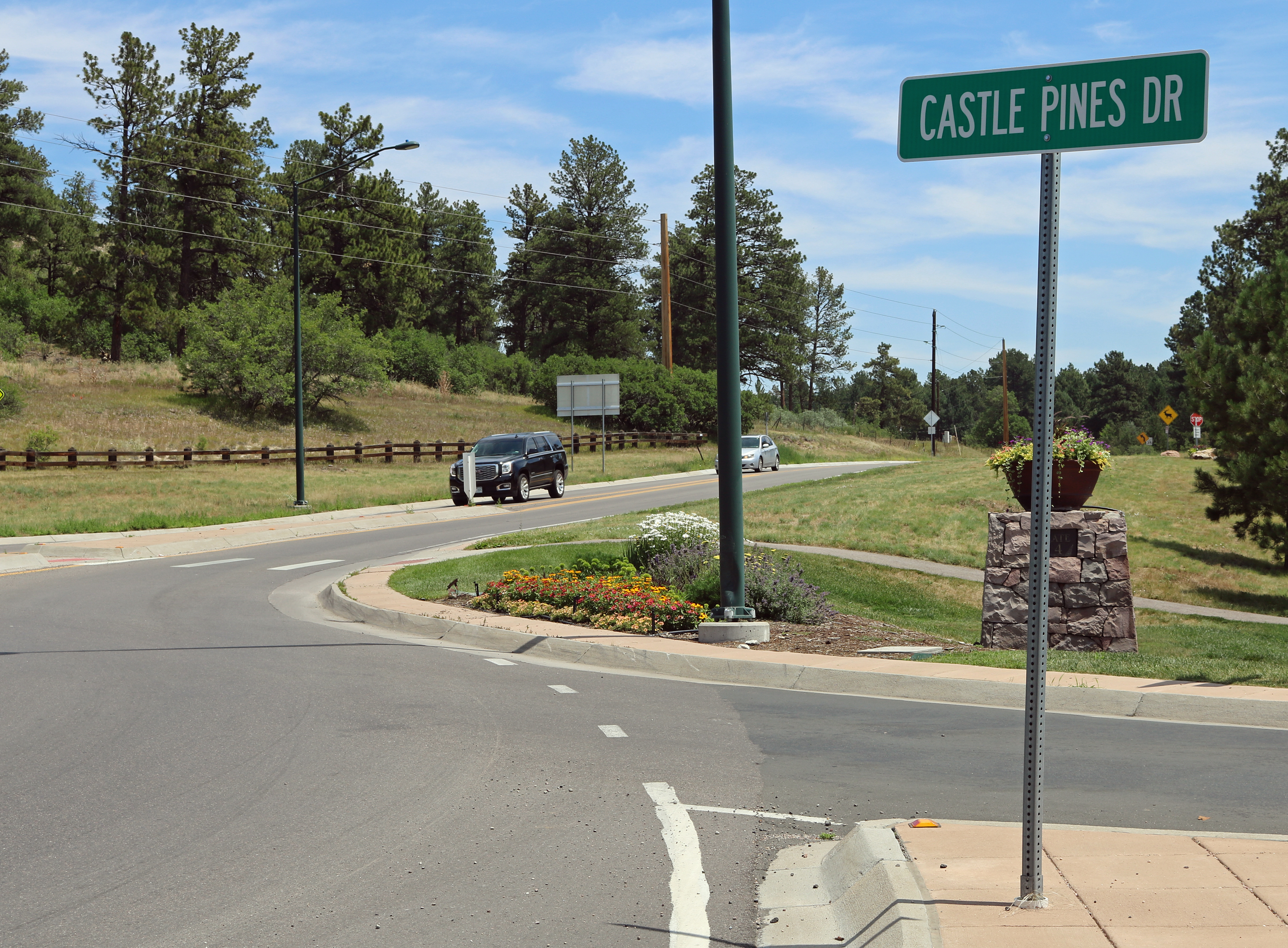
- Looking uphill from the intersection of Happy Canyon Road and Castle Pines Drive.

- Location of the Castle Pines Village CDP in Douglas County, Colorado
- Coordinates: 39.4319°N 104.8919°W
- Country: United States
- State: Colorado
- County: Douglas
- Founded: 1981

Government
  - Type: Unincorporated community
  - Body: Douglas County

Area
  - Total: 4.453 sq mi (11.532 km^{2})
  - Land: 4.453 sq mi (11.532 km^{2})
  - Water: 0 sq mi (0.000 km^{2})
- Elevation: 6,139 ft (1,871 m)

Population (2020)
  - Total: 4,327
  - Density: 971.8/sq mi (375.2/km^{2})
- Time zone: UTC−07:00 (MST)
  - Summer (DST): UTC−06:00 (MDT)
- ZIP code: Castle Pines, Colorado 80108
- Area codes: 303/720/983
- GNIS CDP ID: 2407985
- FIPS code: 08-12393

Castle Pines Village, also known as The Village at Castle Pines or The Village, is an unincorporated community and a census-designated place (CDP) located in Douglas County, Colorado, United States. The CDP is a part of the Denver–Aurora–Lakewood, CO Metropolitan Statistical Area. The population of the Castle Pines Village CDP was 4,327 at the United States Census 2020. Douglas County governs the unincorporated community and the Castle Pines Metropolitan District provides services. The Castle Pines, Colorado post office (Zip Code 80108) serves the area.

== History ==
Castle Pines Village was founded as a gated residential community and lies at an elevation of 6,000 to 6,500 feet (1,800 to 2,000 m) along the Front Range of the Rocky Mountains. It is the northernmost incidence of tablelands along the Front Range with views of Pikes Peak, Mount Blue Sky and the Rocky Mountains. The community surrounds the Castle Pines Golf Club and the Country Club at Castle Pines.

Castle Pines Golf Club, founded by Jack A. Vickers and designed by Jack Nicklaus, opened in 1981. The International professional golf tournament was an annual PGA Tour event contested at Castle Pines Golf Club from 1986 through 2006.

On September 11, 2018, the Castle Pines Homes Association changed the name of the community to The Village at Castle Pines to better distinguish the community from the neighboring areas.

== Geography ==
Castle Pines Village is bordered to the north by the City of Castle Pines and to the south by the town of Castle Rock, the Douglas County seat. The community surrounds the Castle Pines Golf Club and the Country Club at Castle Pines.

The Castle Pines Village CDP has an area of 2,850 acres (11.532 km^{2}), all land.

== Demographics ==
The United States Census Bureau initially defined the Castle Pines Village CDP for the United States Census 2000.

Castle Pines Village CDP, Colorado
| Year | Pop. | ±% |
|---|---|---|
| 2000 | 5,958 | — |
| 2010 | 3,614 | −39.3% |
| 2020 | 4,327 | +19.7% |
Source: United States Census Bureau

=== 2020 census ===
As of the 2020 census, Castle Pines Village had a population of 4,327. The median age was 52.3 years. 20.9% of residents were under the age of 18 and 25.7% were 65 years of age or older. For every 100 females, there were 98.2 males, and for every 100 females age 18 and over, there were 98.4 males age 18 and over.

94.3% of residents lived in urban areas, while 5.7% lived in rural areas.

There were 1,594 households, of which 30.1% had children under the age of 18 living in them. Of all households, 82.1% were married-couple households, 7.0% were households with a male householder and no spouse or partner present, and 8.6% were households with a female householder and no spouse or partner present. About 9.8% of all households were made up of individuals and 5.5% had someone living alone who was 65 years of age or older.

There were 1,733 housing units, of which 8.0% were vacant. The homeowner vacancy rate was 1.8% and the rental vacancy rate was 17.0%.

Racial composition as of the 2020 census
| Race | Number | Percent |
|---|---|---|
| White | 3,879 | 89.6% |
| Black or African American | 48 | 1.1% |
| American Indian and Alaska Native | 5 | 0.1% |
| Asian | 101 | 2.3% |
| Native Hawaiian and Other Pacific Islander | 0 | 0.0% |
| Some other race | 31 | 0.7% |
| Two or more races | 263 | 6.1% |
| Hispanic or Latino (of any race) | 194 | 4.5% |

=== 2011–2013 ACS estimates ===
In the ACS of 2011–2013, the average household size was 2.65 and the average family size was 2.86.

The ACS estimated that 3.8% of residents were between ages 18 and 24, 16.1% were between ages 25 and 44, and 42.5% were between ages 45 and 64.

=== Income and poverty ===
The estimated median annual income for a household in the community over the period 2007-2011 was $208,008, and the median income for a family was $209,915. Males had a median income of $208,654 versus $109,118 for females. The per capita income for the town was $118,043. No families and 0.5% of the population were below the poverty line, including none of those under age 18 and 1.8% of those age 65 or over.

== Education ==
The Douglas County School District serves Castle Pines Village.

== Economy ==
For the period 2007–2011, the American Community Survey estimated that 59.0% of the population over the age of 16 was in the labor force. 0.0% was in the armed forces, and 59.0% was in the civilian labor force with 56.8% employed and 2.2% unemployed. The composition, by occupation, of the employed civilian labor force was: 61.1% in management, business, science, and arts; 32.0% in sales and office occupations; 4.1% in service occupations; 1.9% in production, transportation, and material moving; 0.9% in natural resources, construction, and maintenance. The three industries employing the largest percentages of the working civilian labor force were: professional, scientific, and management, and administrative and waste management services (19.2%); finance and insurance, and real estate and rental and leasing (18.7%); and educational services, health care, and social assistance (15.3).

The estimated median home value in the community between 2007 and 2011 was $935,100, the median selected monthly owner cost was $4,000+ for housing units with a mortgage and $1,000+ for those without, and the median gross rent was $2,000+.

== Government ==
Castle Pines Village is an unincorporated area of Douglas County, Colorado, officially represented by a county commissioner.

Castle Pines Homes Association (CPHA), established in 1981, is the homeowners association that manages the community through a five-member board of directors funded by dues and assessments. Police and fire services for the community are provided by Douglas County and South Metro Fire Rescue and are supplemented by Castle Pines Emergency Services, the Emergency Services department of the CPHA.

== Infrastructure ==
=== Transportation ===
Castle Pines Village is located west of Interstate 25. The city is served by Denver International Airport and nearby Centennial Airport.

=== Utilities ===
Castle Pines Metropolitan District, established in 1973, is the special district that provides water supply, wastewater treatment, storm drainage, and street improvements to the community and is governed by an elected five-member board of directors.

== Notable residents ==
- Garrett Atkins (1979-), former MLB third baseman
- Dale Douglass (1936-), professional golfer
- Charlie Ergen (1953-), founder of Dish Network
- Vance Joseph (1972-), NFL coach
- Case Keenum (1988-), NFL quarterback
- Ed McCaffrey (1968-), 2-time Super Bowl wide receiver
- Bo Nix, NFL quarterback

== See also ==
- Denver–Aurora–Centennial, CO Metropolitan Statistical Area
- Front Range Urban Corridor
