= The Pinery, Colorado =

Unincorporated community in Douglas County, CO, USA

- Census-designated place
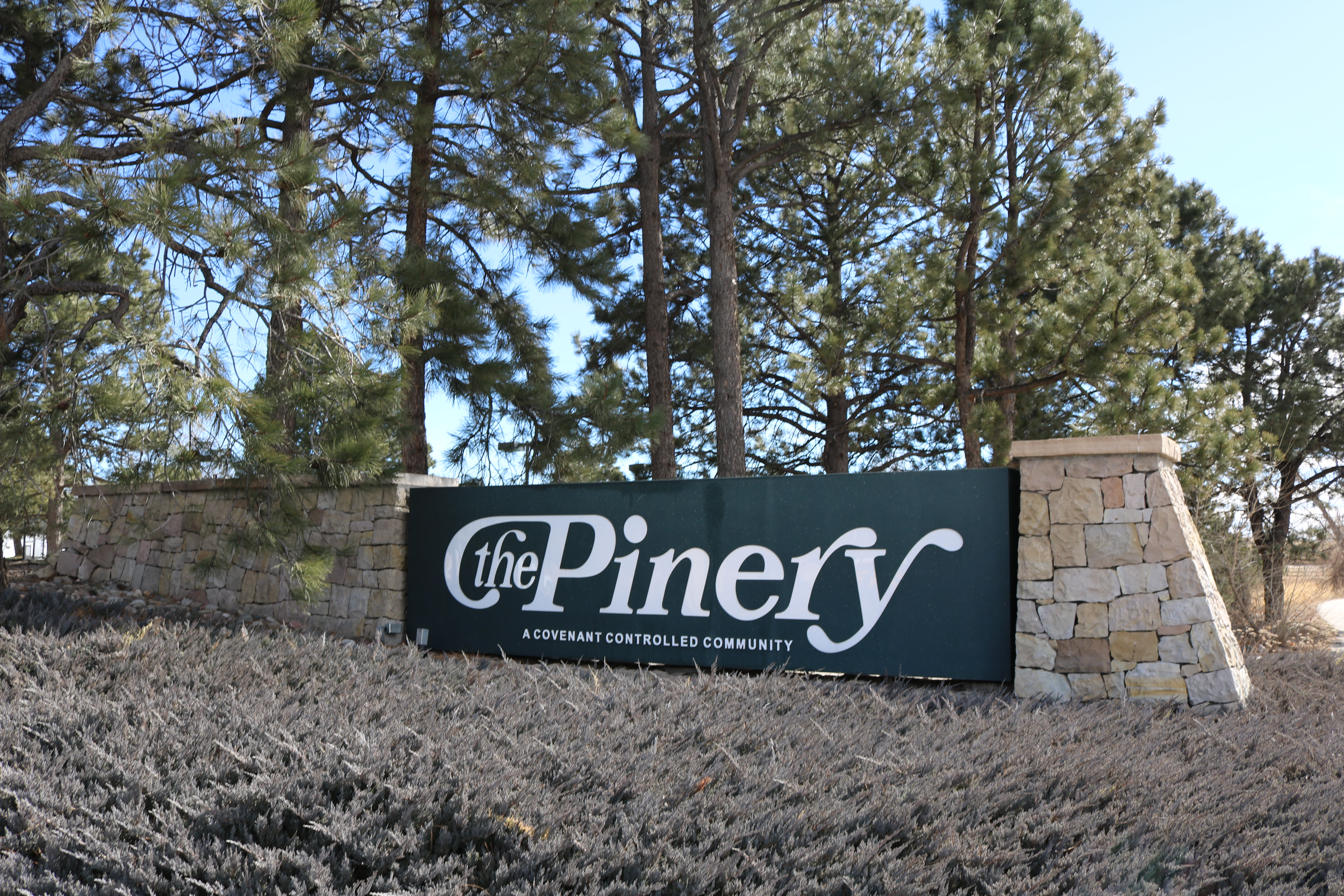
- Entrance sign at North Pinery Parkway and State Highway 83.

- Location of The Pinery CDP in Douglas County, Colorado
- Coordinates: 39°26′55″N 104°44′38″W
- Country: United States
- State: Colorado
- County: Douglas County

Government
  - Type: Unincorporated community

Area
  - Total: 10.416 sq mi (26.978 km^{2})
  - Land: 10.379 sq mi (26.882 km^{2})
  - Water: 0.037 sq mi (0.096 km^{2})
- Elevation: 6,067 ft (1,849 m)

Population (2020)
  - Total: 11,311
  - Density: 1,089.8/sq mi (420.76/km^{2})
- Time zone: UTC-7 (MST)
  - Summer (DST): UTC-6 (MDT)
- ZIP Code: Parker 80134
- Area codes: 303 & 720
- GNIS CDP ID: 2410075

The Pinery is an unincorporated community and a census-designated place (CDP) located in and governed by Douglas County, Colorado, United States. The CDP is a part of the Denver–Aurora–Lakewood, CO Metropolitan Statistical Area. The population of The Pinery CDP was 11,311 at the United States Census 2020. Douglas County governs the unincorporated community. The Parker post office (Zip Code 80134) serves the area.

== Geography ==
The Pinery is bordered to the north by the town of Parker and to the southwest by the town of Castle Rock, the Douglas County seat. Colorado State Highway 83 runs through the center of the CDP, leading north 4 miles (6 km) to the center of Parker and south 4 miles to Franktown. The center of Castle Rock is 11 miles (18 km) to the south and west via Franktown.

The Pinery CDP has an area of 6,670 acres (26.98 km^{2}), including 24 acres (0.096 km^{2}) of water.

== Demographics ==
The United States Census Bureau initially defined The Pinery CDP for the 1990 United States census.

The Pinery CDP, Colorado
Year	Pop.	±%
1990	4,885	—
2000	7,253	+48.5%
2010	10,517	+45.0%
2020	11,311	+7.5%
Source: United States Census Bureau

=== 2020 census ===
As of the 2020 census, The Pinery had a population of 11,311. The median age was 46.1 years. 24.2% of residents were under the age of 18 and 17.9% of residents were 65 years of age or older. For every 100 females there were 102.4 males, and for every 100 females age 18 and over there were 99.1 males age 18 and over.

94.4% of residents lived in urban areas, while 5.6% lived in rural areas.

There were 3,874 households in The Pinery, of which 36.4% had children under the age of 18 living in them. Of all households, 78.9% were married-couple households, 8.0% were households with a male householder and no spouse or partner present, and 10.1% were households with a female householder and no spouse or partner present. About 9.5% of all households were made up of individuals and 4.8% had someone living alone who was 65 years of age or older.

There were 3,978 housing units, of which 2.6% were vacant. The homeowner vacancy rate was 1.1% and the rental vacancy rate was 6.0%.

Racial composition as of the 2020 census
Race	Number	Percent
White	9,890	87.4%
Black or African American	105	0.9%
American Indian and Alaska Native	43	0.4%
Asian	209	1.8%
Native Hawaiian and Other Pacific Islander	7	0.1%
Some other race	144	1.3%
Two or more races	913	8.1%
Hispanic or Latino (of any race)	825	7.3%

== Education ==
The Douglas County School District serves the Pinery.

== See also ==
- Denver-Aurora-Boulder, CO Combined Statistical Area
- Denver-Aurora-Broomfield, CO Metropolitan Statistical Area
