= Meridian, Colorado =

Unincorporated community in Colorado, US

- Census-designated place
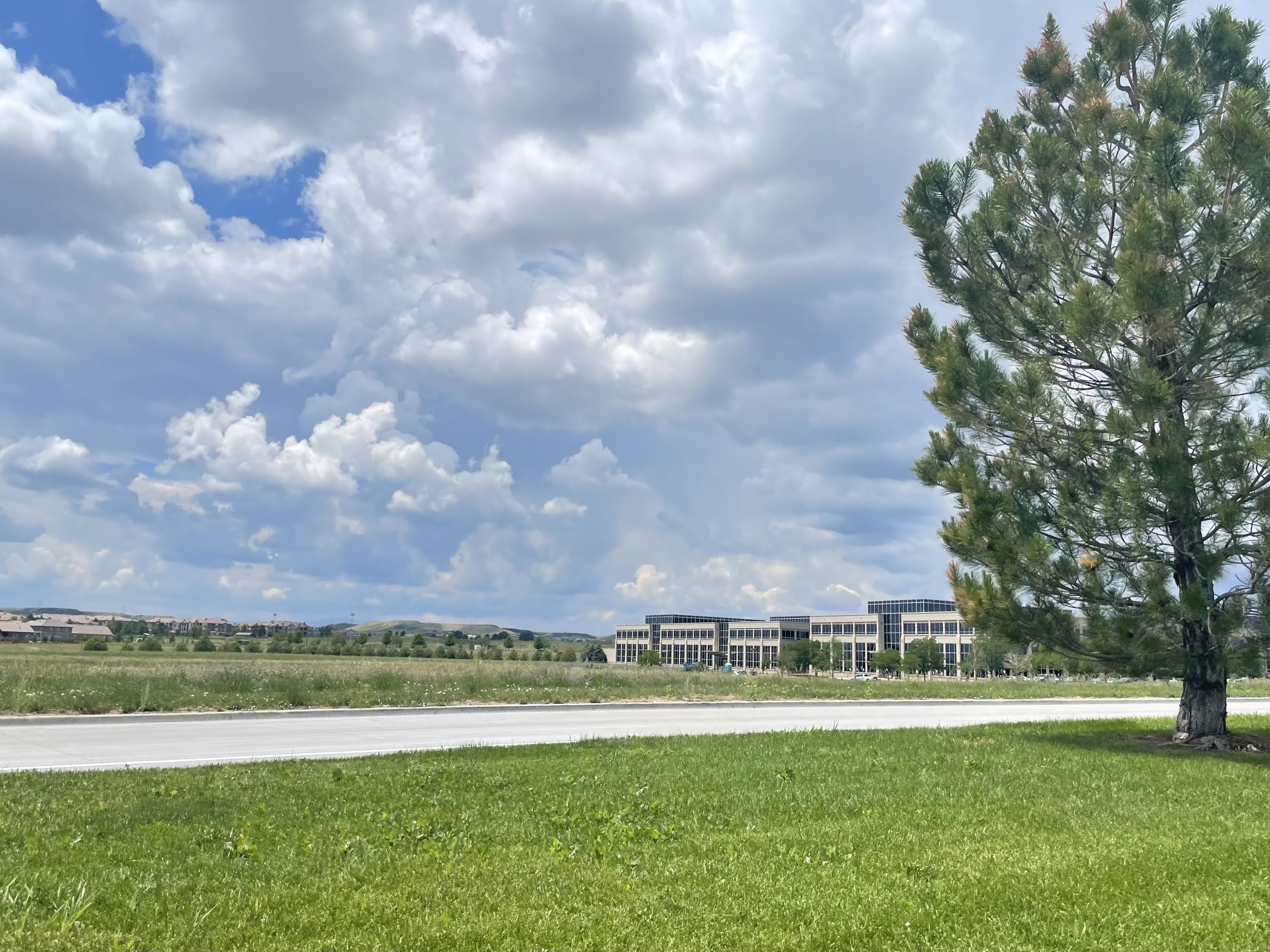
- Meridian in 2021
- Interactive map of Meridian, Colorado
- Coordinates: 39°32′44″N 104°51′12″W
- Country: United States
- State: Colorado
- County: Douglas County

Government
  - Type: Unincorporated community

Area
  - Total: 0.509 sq mi (1.319 km^{2})
  - Land: 0.509 sq mi (1.319 km^{2})
  - Water: 0 sq mi (0.000 km^{2})
- Elevation: 5,932 ft (1,808 m)

Population (2020)
  - Total: 4,786
  - Density: 9,398/sq mi (3,629/km^{2})
- Time zone: UTC-7 (MST)
  - Summer (DST): UTC-6 (MDT)
- ZIP Code: 80112
- Area codes: 303 & 720
- GNIS feature ID: 2408817

Meridian is an unincorporated community and a census-designated place (CDP) located in and governed by Douglas County, Colorado, United States. The CDP is a part of the Denver–Aurora–Lakewood, CO Metropolitan Statistical Area. The population of the Meridian CDP was 4,786 at the United States Census 2020. The CDP lies in ZIP code 80112.

== Geography ==
The Meridian CDP is located in northern Douglas County at 39.53’89”N 104.84’75”W at 5,964 feet above sea level, higher than Denver. Meridian roughly spans from the intersection of I-25 and Inverness Parkway south to the intersection of I-25 and Lincoln Avenue, east along Lincoln Avenue to North 1st Street, north along North 1st Street until E-470 where the boundary then meanders northeast until South Chambers Road, where it finally spans due west back to the intersection of I-25 and Inverness Parkway. The plot of developed land just south of Lincoln Avenue is included in the CDP as well. According to the United States Census Bureau, the CDP has a total area of 2.56 square miles, all of which is land. It is bordered to the north by Centennial, to the west and south by Lone Tree, and to the east by Parker; Denver is 18 miles to the north. The natural geography of Meridian can be characterized by slow, rolling hills covered in thick grass and brush.

== Demographics ==
The United States Census Bureau initially defined the Meridian CDP for the United States Census 2000.

Meridian CDP, Colorado
| Year | Pop. | ±% |
|---|---|---|
| 2000 | 184 | — |
| 2010 | 2,970 | +1514.1% |
| 2020 | 4,786 | +61.1% |
Source: United States Census Bureau

=== 2020 census ===
As of the 2020 census, Meridian had a population of 4,786. The median age was 34.0 years. 18.6% of residents were under the age of 18 and 9.3% of residents were 65 years of age or older. For every 100 females there were 99.3 males, and for every 100 females age 18 and over there were 100.1 males age 18 and over.

100.0% of residents lived in urban areas, while 0.0% lived in rural areas.

There were 2,453 households in Meridian, of which 22.3% had children under the age of 18 living in them. Of all households, 31.8% were married-couple households, 29.0% were households with a male householder and no spouse or partner present, and 31.7% were households with a female householder and no spouse or partner present. About 46.2% of all households were made up of individuals and 10.5% had someone living alone who was 65 years of age or older.

There were 2,621 housing units, of which 6.4% were vacant. The homeowner vacancy rate was 1.6% and the rental vacancy rate was 6.3%.

Racial composition as of the 2020 census
| Race | Number | Percent |
|---|---|---|
| White | 3,187 | 66.6% |
| Black or African American | 179 | 3.7% |
| American Indian and Alaska Native | 28 | 0.6% |
| Asian | 834 | 17.4% |
| Native Hawaiian and Other Pacific Islander | 1 | 0.0% |
| Some other race | 127 | 2.7% |
| Two or more races | 430 | 9.0% |
| Hispanic or Latino (of any race) | 535 | 11.2% |

== Education ==
The Douglas County School District serves Meridian.

== Economy ==
The Meridian International Business Center, from which the CDP derives its name, hosts the headquarters of three Fortune 500 Companies, including; Dish Network, Liberty Media, and Qurate Retail. Other notable employers within Meridian include; Toyota, American Family Insurance, Sierra Nevada, Jacobs, and Toastmasters.

== See also ==
- Denver-Aurora-Boulder, CO Combined Statistical Area
- Denver-Aurora-Broomfield, CO Metropolitan Statistical Area
