= Castle Pines, Colorado =

City in Colorado, US

- Home rule city
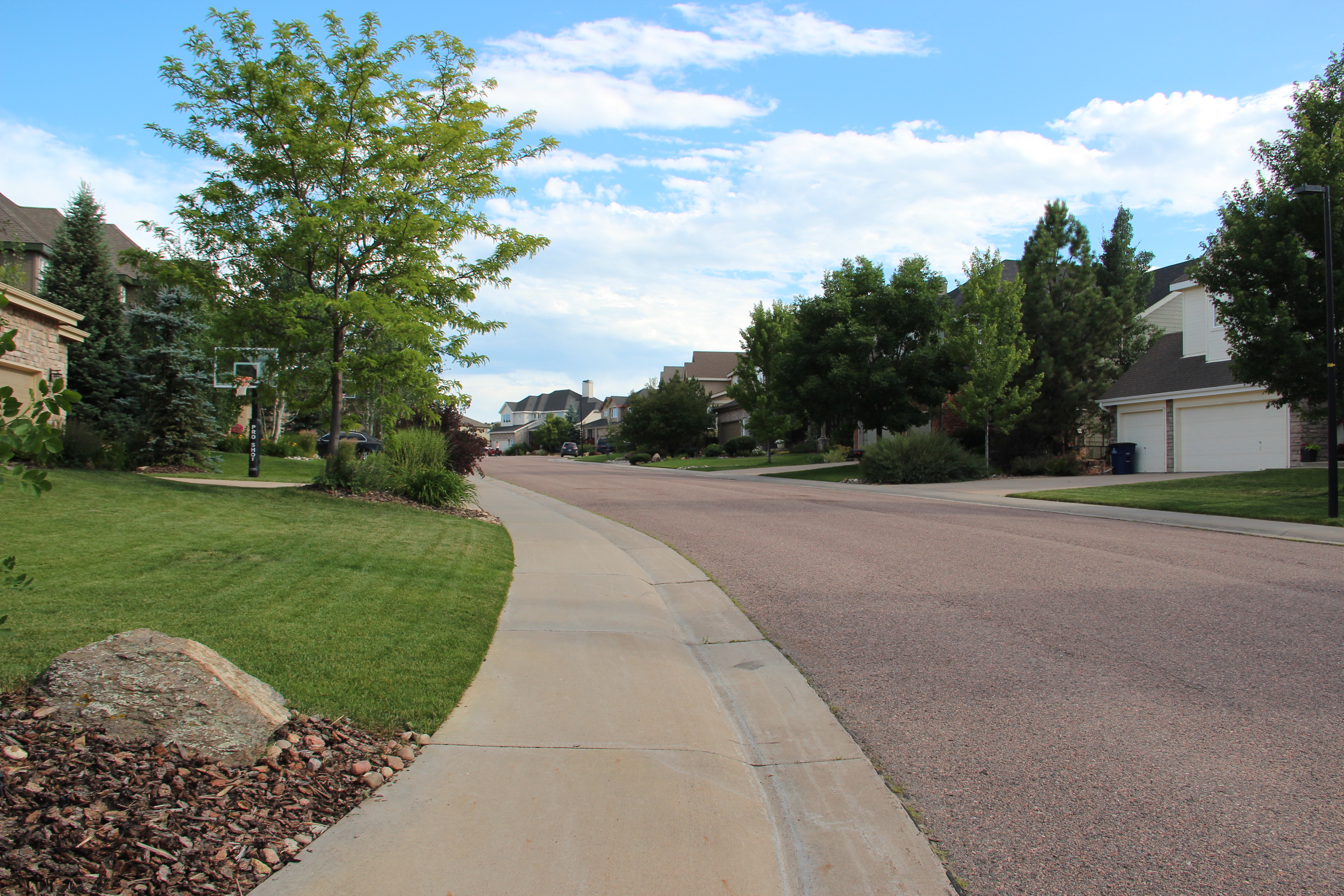
- Castle Pines, Colorado.

- Location of the City of Castle Pines in Douglas County, Colorado
- Coordinates: 39°28′12″N 104°53′12″W
- Country: United States
- State: Colorado
- County: Douglas
- Incorporated: November 6, 2007

Government
  - Type: Home rule city

Area
  - Total: 9.594 sq mi (24.849 km^{2})
  - Land: 9.594 sq mi (24.849 km^{2})
  - Water: 0 sq mi (0.000 km^{2})
- Elevation: 6,559 ft (1,999 m)

Population (2020)
  - Total: 11,036
  - Estimate (2025): 15,583
  - Density: 1,150/sq mi (440/km^{2})
- Time zone: UTC−07:00 (MST)
  - Summer (DST): UTC−06:00 (MDT)
- ZIP code: 80108
- Area codes: 303/720/983
- GNIS town ID: 2500981
- FIPS code: 08-12387
- Website: www.castlepinesco.gov
- Colorado's newest municipality

The City of Castle Pines is a home rule municipality located in Douglas County, Colorado, United States. The city population was 11,036 at the 2020 United States census. Castle Pines is a part of the Denver–Aurora–Lakewood, CO Metropolitan Statistical Area and the Front Range Urban Corridor. The city is located north of Castle Rock and south of Lone Tree.

== History ==
The "City of Castle Pines North" was approved by popular vote on November 6, 2007, and officially incorporated with the first election of municipal officers on February 12, 2008. At the time of incorporation, Castle Pines was Douglas County's first new city since 1995, and Colorado's 271st municipality.

The "City of Castle Pines North" was officially renamed the "City of Castle Pines" by popular vote on November 2, 2010.

== Geography ==
Castle Pines is located on Interstate 25 in central Colorado, 20 mi (32 km) south of downtown Denver and 43 mi (69 km) north of Colorado Springs.

The city lies in the Colorado Piedmont on the western edge of the Great Plains. Happy Canyon Creek runs north-northeast through the western part of the city, and Newlin Gulch and its tributary, South Newlin Gulch, run north-northeast and north, respectively, through the eastern part of the city. All three streams are part of the Cherry Creek watershed.

At the 2020 United States census, the city had a total area of 6,140 acres (24.849 km^{2}), all of it land.

Lying within the Front Range Urban Corridor, the city is part of the greater Denver metropolitan area, and it borders two communities to its south: Castle Pines Village and Castle Rock, the county seat.

== Demographics ==
Historical population
Census	Pop.	Note	%±
2010	10,360		—
2020	11,036		6.5%
2025 (est.)	15,583	▲	41.2%
U.S. Decennial Census

=== 2020 census ===
As of the 2020 census, Castle Pines had a population of 11,036. The median age was 44.4 years. 27.0% of residents were under the age of 18 and 15.1% of residents were 65 years of age or older. For every 100 females there were 97.5 males, and for every 100 females age 18 and over there were 94.3 males age 18 and over.

98.6% of residents lived in urban areas, while 1.4% lived in rural areas.

There were 3,846 households in Castle Pines, of which 42.4% had children under the age of 18 living in them. Of all households, 73.1% were married-couple households, 9.3% were households with a male householder and no spouse or partner present, and 14.2% were households with a female householder and no spouse or partner present. About 13.4% of all households were made up of individuals and 7.2% had someone living alone who was 65 years of age or older.

There were 4,005 housing units, of which 4.0% were vacant. The homeowner vacancy rate was 1.4% and the rental vacancy rate was 7.5%.

Racial composition as of the 2020 census
Race	Number	Percent
White	9,426	85.4%
Black or African American	104	0.9%
American Indian and Alaska Native	48	0.4%
Asian	379	3.4%
Native Hawaiian and Other Pacific Islander	21	0.2%
Some other race	131	1.2%
Two or more races	927	8.4%
Hispanic or Latino (of any race)	754	6.8%

=== 2010 census ===
As of the 2010 census, there were 10,360 people, 3,493 households, and 2,928 families residing in the city. The population density was 1,149.8 inhabitants per square mile (443.9/km^{2}). There were 3,637 housing units at an average density of 403.7 per square mile (155.9/km^{2}). The racial makeup of the city was 92.6% White, 2.6% Asian, 1.1% African American, 0.2% American Indian, 0.1% Pacific Islander, 1.0% from other races, and 2.3% from two or more races. Hispanics and Latinos of any race were 5.5% of the population.

There were 3,493 households, out of which 50.0% had children under the age of 18 living with them, 76.3% were married couples living together, 2.7% had a male householder with no wife present, 4.9% had a female householder with no husband present, and 16.2% were non-families. 13.0% of all households were made up of individuals, and 2.7% had someone living alone who was 65 years of age or older. The average household size was 2.97, and the average family size was 3.27.

In the city, the population was spread out, with 33.6% under the age of 18, 3.8% from 18 to 24, 24.8% from 25 to 44, 30.2% from 45 to 64, and 7.6% who were 65 years of age or older. The median age was 39.5 years. The gender makeup of the city was 49.7% male and 50.3% female.

Castle Pines is one of the most affluent cities in the United States. The median income for a household in the city was $137,019, and the median income for a family was $147,473. Males had a median income of $118,235 versus $71,399 for females. The per capita income for the city was $49,702. About 0.9% of families and 1.7% of the population were below the poverty line, including 2.9% of those under age 18 and 0.0% of those age 65 or over.

== Economy ==
As of 2011, 69.5% of the population over the age of 16 was in the labor force. 0.2% was in the armed forces, and 69.4% was in the civilian labor force with 66.8% employed and 2.6% unemployed. The occupational composition of the employed civilian labor force was: 58.3% in management, business, science, and arts; 28.7% in sales and office occupations; 7.6% in service occupations; 4.6% in production, transportation, and material moving; 0.8% in natural resources, construction, and maintenance. The three industries employing the largest percentages of the working civilian labor force were: educational services, health care, and social assistance (17.1%); professional, scientific, and management, and administrative and waste management services (16.7%); and finance and insurance, and real estate and rental and leasing (14.5%).

The median home value in the city was $457,500, the median selected monthly owner cost was $2,654 for housing units with a mortgage and $731 for those without, and the median gross rent was $1,294.

== Government ==
The City of Castle Pines is a home ruled city and follows the Mayor-Council government system. The City receives the majority of its revenue through sales and use tax collections. The City receives a portion of the revenue collected through property taxes, but these dollars are dedicated to fund law enforcement.

The residents of the City of Castle Pines North elected their first city officials on February 12, 2008.

== Parks and recreation ==
Castle Pines is home to 5 parks and 14 miles of trails that are 8-feet wide and paved to accommodate a variety of recreational activities. Walking, running and bicycling is permitted on trails, however horseback riding and the use of motorized vehicles is prohibited. The Castle Pines North Metropolitan District maintains most trails in Castle Pines.

Castle Pines parks and natural areas include:

- Elk Ridge Park
- Retreat Park
- Coyote Ridge Park
- Daniel's Gate Park
- Daniels Park

== Schools ==
Students residing in Castle Pines are within the Douglas County School District.

Primary Schools:

- Castle Pines Academy
- American Academy
- DCS Montessori

Elementary Schools:

- Buffalo Ridge Elementary
- Timber Trail Elementary
- DCS Montessori
- American Academy

Middle Schools:

- DCS Montessori
- American Academy

== Transportation ==
Castle Pines is located adjacent to Interstate 25. The city is served by Denver International Airport and nearby Centennial Airport.

== See also ==
- Front Range Urban Corridor
- List of municipalities in Colorado
