= Stonegate, Colorado =

Unincorporated community in Douglas County, CO, USA

- Census-designated place
- Location of the Stonegate CDP in Douglas County, Colorado
- Coordinates: 39°32′08″N 104°48′12″W
- Country: United States
- State: Colorado
- County: Douglas County

Government
  - Type: Unincorporated community

Area
  - Total: 1.844 sq mi (4.777 km^{2})
  - Land: 1.832 sq mi (4.745 km^{2})
  - Water: 0.012 sq mi (0.032 km^{2})
- Elevation: 5,896 ft (1,797 m)

Population (2020)
  - Total: 9,072
  - Density: 4,952/sq mi (1,912/km^{2})
- Time zone: UTC-7 (MST)
  - Summer (DST): UTC-6 (MDT)
- ZIP Code: 80134
- Area codes: 303 & 720
- GNIS feature ID: 2410002

Stonegate is an unincorporated community and a census-designated place (CDP) located in and governed by Douglas County, Colorado, United States. The CDP is a part of the Denver–Aurora–Lakewood, CO Metropolitan Statistical Area. The population of the Stonegate CDP was 9,072 at the United States Census 2020. The Stonegate Village Metropolitan District provides services to the community, which lies in ZIP Code 80134.

== Geography ==
Stonegate is located in northeastern Douglas County. It is bordered to the east by the town of Parker and to the west by unincorporated Grand View Estates.

The E-470 toll road around the eastern side of the Denver-Aurora metropolitan area forms the northern edge of Stonegate, with access from Exits 3 and 4. Downtown Denver is 21 miles (34 km) to the northwest.

The Stonegate CDP has an area of 1,180 acres (4.777 km^{2}), including 7.9 acres (0.032 km^{2}) of water.

== Demographics ==
The United States Census Bureau initially defined the Stonegate CDP for the United States Census 2000.

Stonegate CDP, Colorado
| Year | Pop. | ±% |
|---|---|---|
| 2000 | 6,284 | — |
| 2010 | 8,962 | +42.6% |
| 2020 | 9,072 | +1.2% |
Source: United States Census Bureau

=== 2020 census ===
As of the 2020 census, Stonegate had a population of 9,072. The median age was 38.1 years. 28.7% of residents were under the age of 18 and 9.4% of residents were 65 years of age or older. For every 100 females there were 93.8 males, and for every 100 females age 18 and over there were 93.6 males age 18 and over.

100.0% of residents lived in urban areas, while 0.0% lived in rural areas.

There were 3,148 households in Stonegate, of which 43.0% had children under the age of 18 living in them. Of all households, 66.3% were married-couple households, 10.6% were households with a male householder and no spouse or partner present, and 18.7% were households with a female householder and no spouse or partner present. About 16.8% of all households were made up of individuals and 6.3% had someone living alone who was 65 years of age or older.

There were 3,184 housing units, of which 1.1% were vacant. The homeowner vacancy rate was 0.2% and the rental vacancy rate was 2.7%.

Racial composition as of the 2020 census
| Race | Number | Percent |
|---|---|---|
| White | 7,539 | 83.1% |
| Black or African American | 105 | 1.2% |
| American Indian and Alaska Native | 30 | 0.3% |
| Asian | 421 | 4.6% |
| Native Hawaiian and Other Pacific Islander | 8 | 0.1% |
| Some other race | 143 | 1.6% |
| Two or more races | 826 | 9.1% |
| Hispanic or Latino (of any race) | 805 | 8.9% |

== Education ==
The Douglas County School District serves Stonegate.

== See also ==
- Denver-Aurora-Boulder, CO Combined Statistical Area
- Denver-Aurora-Broomfield, CO Metropolitan Statistical Area
