= Douglas County, Colorado =

County in Colorado, United States

- County
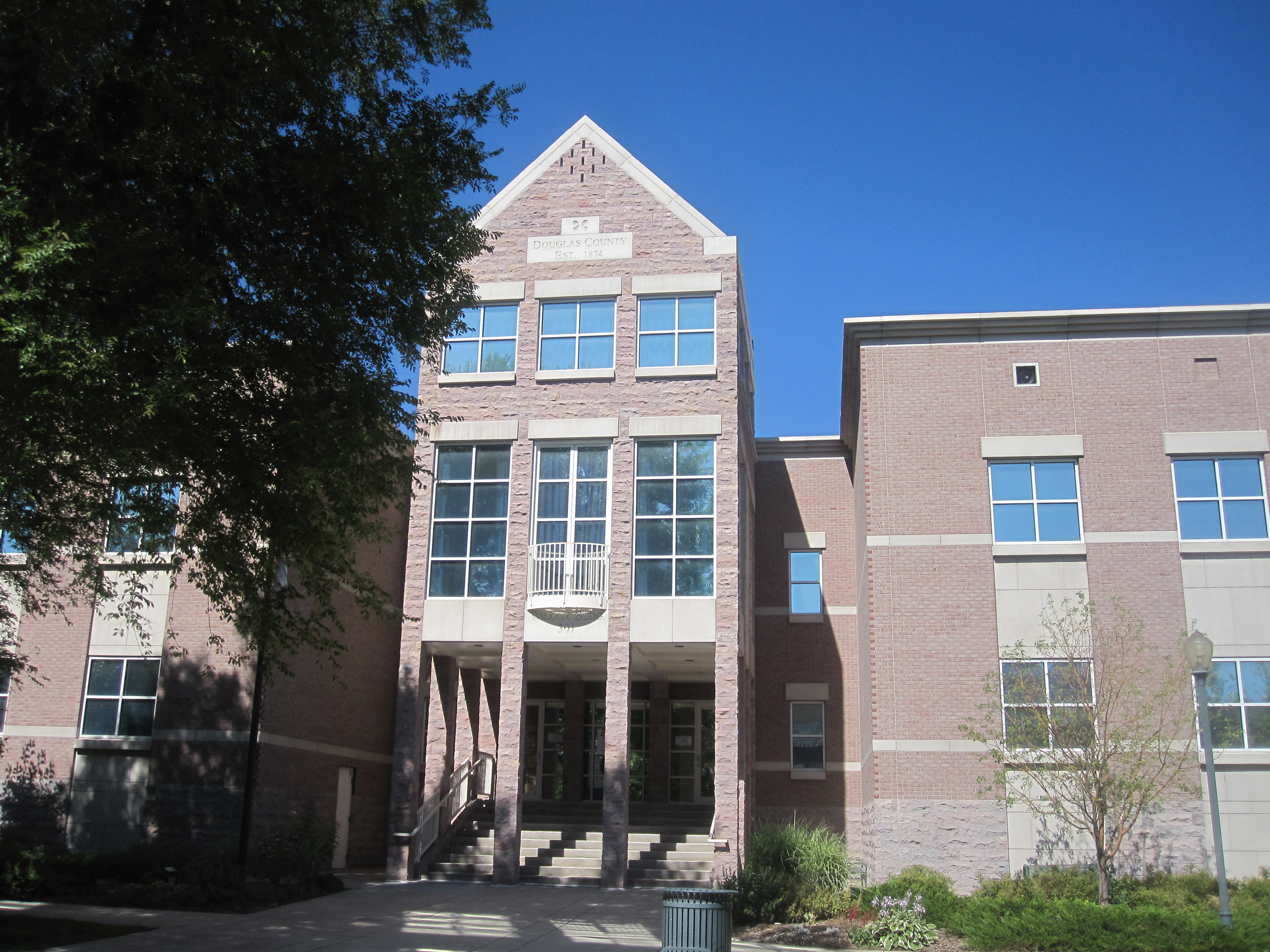
- One of two county buildings for Douglas County in Castle Rock

- Flag Seal Logo

- Location within the U.S. state of Colorado
- Coordinates: 39.35°N 104.93°W
- Country: United States
- State: Colorado
- Founded: November 1, 1861
- Named for: Stephen A. Douglas
- Seat: Castle Rock
- Largest community: Highlands Ranch

Area
  - Total: 843 sq mi (2,180 km^{2})
  - Land: 840 sq mi (2,200 km^{2})
  - Water: 2.6 sq mi (6.7 km^{2}) 0.3%

Population (2020)
  - Total: 357,978
  - Estimate (2025): 399,396 ▲
  - Density: 430/sq mi (160/km^{2})
- Time zone: UTC−7 (Mountain)
  - Summer (DST): UTC−6 (MDT)
- Congressional districts: 4th, 6th
- Website: www.douglasco.gov

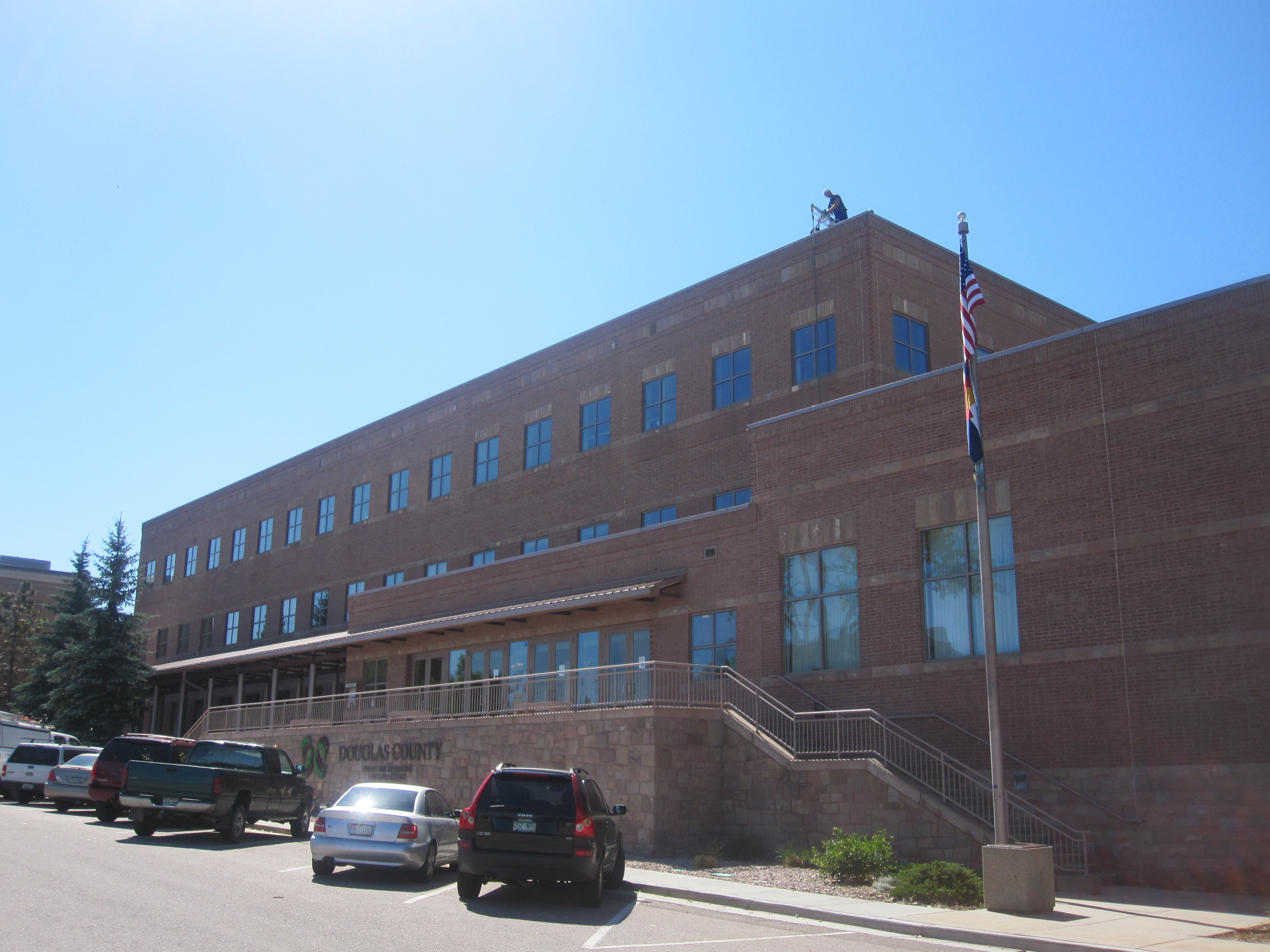
Second Douglas County office building in Castle Rock

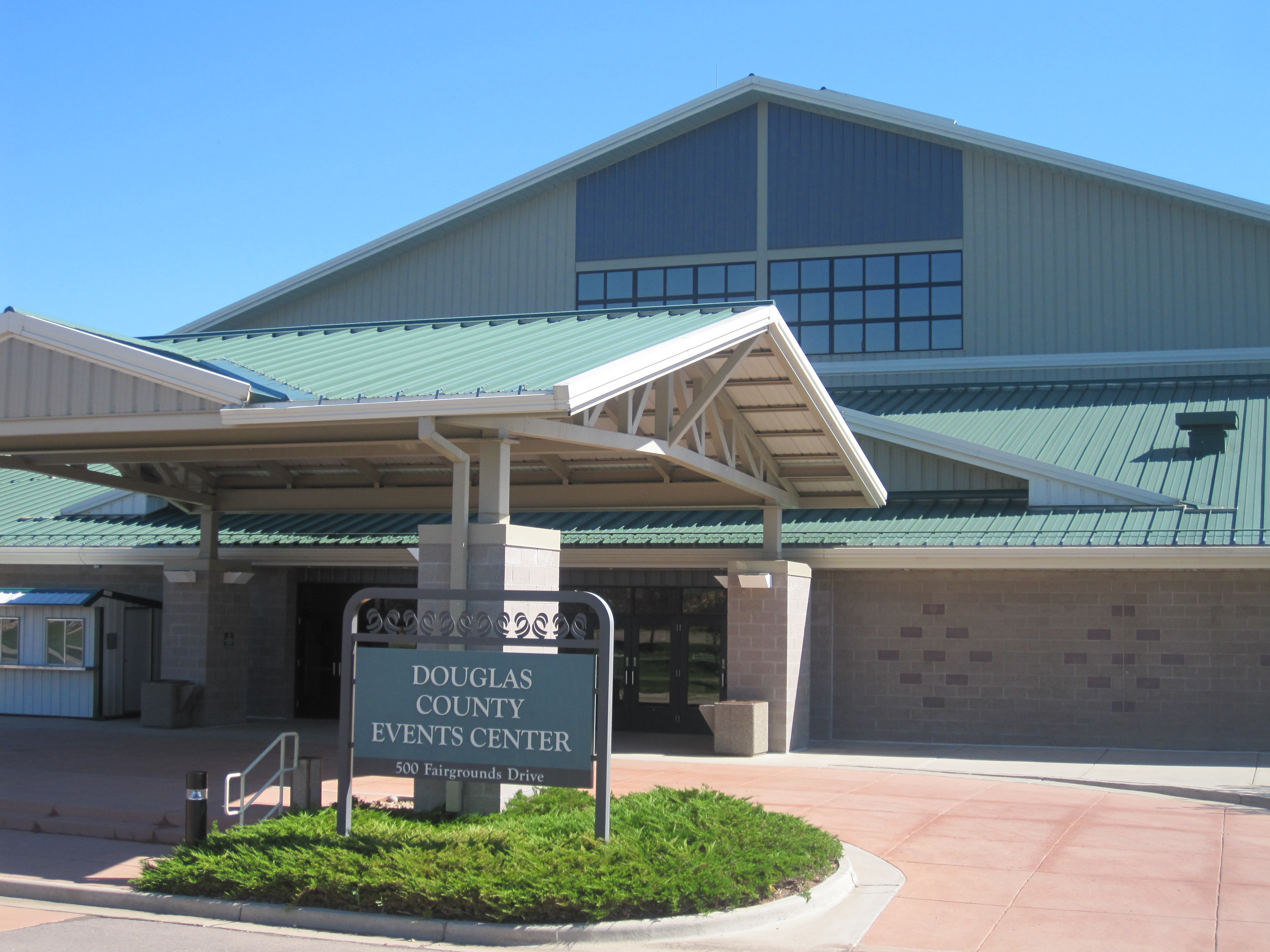
Douglas County Events Center and Fairgrounds in Castle Rock

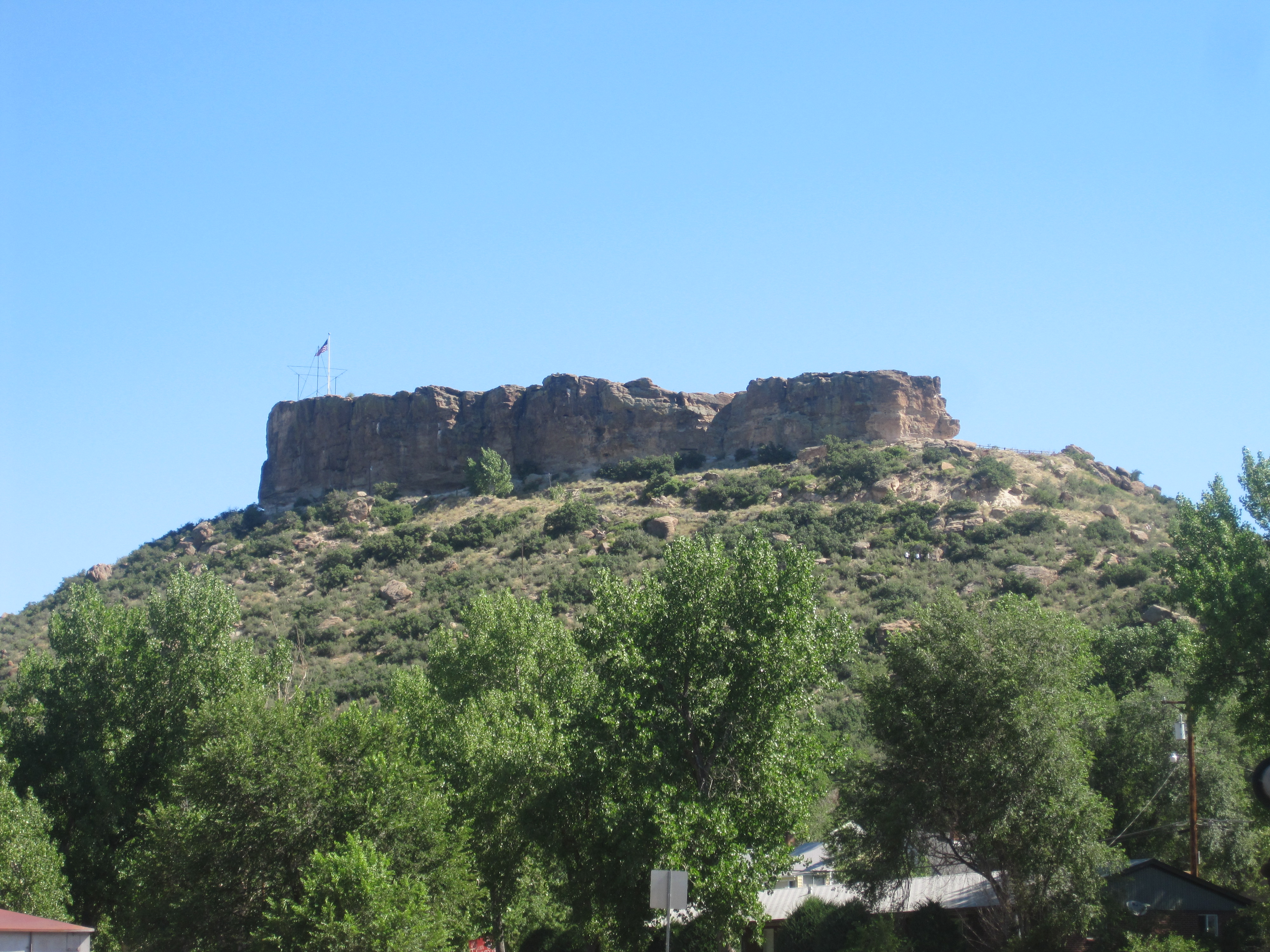
The "rock castle" of Castle Rock, Colorado

Douglas County is a county located in the U.S. state of Colorado. As of the 2020 Census, the population was 357,978. The county is named in honor of U.S. Senator Stephen A. Douglas. The county seat is Castle Rock.

Douglas County is part of the Denver metropolitan area. It is located midway between Colorado's two largest cities, Denver and Colorado Springs, and contains a portion of Aurora, the state's third-largest city. Douglas County has the highest median household income of any Colorado county or statistical equivalent. As of the 2020 Census, Douglas County has the 9th highest household income of any county or county equivalent in the United States.

Douglas County is one of Colorado's fastest growing counties.

== Overview ==
Douglas County is lightly wooded, mostly with ponderosa pine, with broken terrain characterized by mesas, foothills, and small streams. Cherry Creek and Plum Creek rise in Douglas County and flow north toward Denver and into the South Platte River. Both were subject to flash flooding in the past, Plum Creek being partially responsible for the Denver flood of 1965. Cherry Creek and Plum Creek are now dammed.

Most residents commute to workplaces elsewhere in the metropolitan area outside of the county. Suburban development is supplementing the traditional ranching economy of the county.

== History ==
Douglas County was one of the original 17 counties created in the Colorado Territory by the Colorado Territorial Legislature on November 1, 1861. The county was named in honor of U.S. Senator Stephen A. Douglas of Illinois, who died five months before the county was created. The county seat was originally Franktown, but was moved to California Ranch in 1863, and then to Castle Rock in 1874. Although the county's boundaries originally extended eastward to the Kansas state border, in 1874, most of the eastern portion of the county became part of Elbert County.

== Geography ==
According to the U.S. Census Bureau, the county has a total area of 844 square miles (2,190 km^{2}), of which 841 square miles (2,180 km^{2}) are land and 2.6 square miles (6.7 km^{2}) (0.3%) are covered by water.

=== Adjacent counties ===
- Jefferson County, Colorado – west
- Arapahoe County, Colorado – north
- Elbert County, Colorado – east
- El Paso County, Colorado – south
- Teller County, Colorado – southwest

=== Major highways ===
- I-25 / US 87
- US 85
- SH 67
- SH 83
- SH 86
- SH 105
- CR 105
- SH 121
- CR 67

=== Parks and recreational areas ===
Three state parks fall within Douglas County: Castlewood Canyon State Park, Chatfield State Park and Roxborough State Park. Parts of the county lie within the Pike National Forest and were crossed by the historic South Platte Trail.

Recreation trails in the county include:

- American Discovery Trail
- Colorado Trail
- Devils Head National Recreation Trail
- Highline Canal National Recreation Trail
- Platte River Greenway National Recreation Trail
- Ridgeline Open Space Trail
- Bluffs Regional Park Trail

The Rueter–Hess Reservoir, when filled, may provide significant recreation, including fishing, hiking, and nonmotorized boating. If filled to capacity, surface size would be 1,140 acres, making this a fairly significant reservoir in Colorado and Douglas County's largest body of water.

Cherokee Ranch and Castle is a 3,400-acre privately owned property which forms a 12,000-acre open space with the Highlands Ranch Backcountry and Daniels Park. The area is host to a variety of animals and the Cherokee Ranch petrified forest.

The Prairie Canyon Ranch, at 4620 CO-83, about 10 miles (16 km) south of Franktown, is a Douglas County Open Space. It is a working cattle ranch on 978 acres (3.96 km^{2}), open to the public on special events.

== Demographics ==
Historical population
Census	Pop.	Note	%±
1870	1,388		—
1880	2,486		79.1%
1890	3,006		20.9%
1900	3,120		3.8%
1910	3,192		2.3%
1920	3,517		10.2%
1930	3,498		−0.5%
1940	3,496		−0.1%
1950	3,507		0.3%
1960	4,816		37.3%
1970	8,407		74.6%
1980	25,153		199.2%
1990	60,391		140.1%
2000	175,766		191.0%
2010	285,465		62.4%
2020	357,978		25.4%
2025 (est.)	399,396	▲	11.6%
U.S. Decennial Census; 1790–1960 1900–1990; 1990–2000 2010–2020

=== 2020 census ===
As of the 2020 census, the county had a population of 357,978. Of the residents, 25.7% were under the age of 18 and 13.0% were 65 years of age or older; the median age was 39.1 years. For every 100 females there were 98.3 males, and for every 100 females age 18 and over there were 96.1 males. 91.0% of residents lived in urban areas and 9.0% lived in rural areas.

Douglas County, Colorado – Racial and ethnic composition Note: the US Census treats Hispanic/Latino as an ethnic category. This table excludes Latinos from the racial categories and assigns them to a separate category. Hispanics/Latinos may be of any race.
Race / Ethnicity (NH = Non-Hispanic)	Pop 2000	Pop 2010	Pop 2020	% 2000	% 2010	% 2020
White alone (NH)	157,686	243,297	278,770	89.71%	85.23%	77.87%
Black or African American alone (NH)	1,596	3,245	4,788	0.91%	1.14%	1.34%
Native American or Alaska Native alone (NH)	579	803	970	0.33%	0.28%	0.27%
Asian alone (NH)	4,369	10,563	19,807	2.49%	3.70%	5.53%
Pacific Islander alone (NH)	88	175	290	0.05%	0.06%	0.08%
Other race alone (NH)	135	387	1,551	0.08%	0.14%	0.43%
Mixed race or Multiracial (NH)	2,427	5,603	17,692	1.38%	1.96%	4.94%
Hispanic or Latino (any race)	8,886	21,392	34,110	5.06%	7.49%	9.53%
Total	175,766	285,465	357,978	100.00%	100.00%	100.00%

There were 129,862 households in the county, of which 38.3% had children under the age of 18 living with them and 18.0% had a female householder with no spouse or partner present. About 18.6% of all households were made up of individuals and 6.7% had someone living alone who was 65 years of age or older.

There were 135,643 housing units, of which 4.3% were vacant. Among occupied housing units, 77.1% were owner-occupied and 22.9% were renter-occupied. The homeowner vacancy rate was 1.1% and the rental vacancy rate was 7.8%.

=== 2000 census ===
As of the census of 2000, 175,766 people, 60,924 households, and 49,835 families were residing in the county. The population density was 209 people per square mile (81 people/km^{2}). The 63,333 housing units averaged 75 units per square mile (29 units/km^{2}). The racial makeup of the county was 92.77% White, 2.51% Asian, 0.95% African American, 0.41% Native American, 1.49% from other races, and 1.88% from two or more races. Hispanics or Latinos of any race made up 5.06% of the population.

Of the 60,924 households, 47.2% had children under the age of 18 living with them, 73.8% were married couples living together, 5.7% had a female householder with no husband present, and 18.2% were not families. About 13.3% of all households were made up of individuals, and 1.9% had someone living alone who was 65 years of age or older. The average household size was 2.88, and the average family size was 3.19.

In the county, the population distribution was 31.6% under the age of 18, 4.8% from 18 to 24, 37.9% from 25 to 44, 21.6% from 45 to 64, and 4.2% who were 65 years of age or older. The median age was 34 years. For every 100 females, there were 99.7 males. For every 100 females age 18 and over, there were 97.4 males.

The median income for a household in the county was $82,929, and for a family was $88,482 (these figures had risen to $93,819 and $102,767, respectively, as of a 2007 estimate). Males had a median income of $60,729 versus $38,965 for females. The per capita income for the county was $34,848. About 1.6% of families and 2.1% of the population were below the poverty line, including 1.9% of those under age 18 and 3.7% of those age 65 or over.

Douglas County had the highest median household income of any Colorado county or statistical equivalent in 2000. In 2008, it ranked eighth in the United States in that category; it was one of two in the top 15 not in the vicinity of New York or Washington.

=== Health and longevity ===
In 2021, Douglas County was judged by the U.S. News & World Report to be the second healthiest of 3,143 counties and county-equivalents of the United States based on 84 different factors. Residents of the county lived 84.0 years on the average compared to the U.S. average of 77.5 years.

== Government and politics ==
=== County government ===
Douglas County is governed by a three-member Board of County Commissioners, which serves as both the executive and legislative authority of the county. The board selects one of its members to serve as Chair, who acts as the county’s presiding officer.

Board of County Commissioners by partisanship
All 3 districts 2 seats needed for a majority
	Majority party
Party	Republican
Seats	3
- As of 2026; Republican

District	Office	Name
1	Chair, Board of County Commissioners	Abe Laydon (R)
2	County Commissioner	George Teal (R)
3	County Commissioner	Kevin Van Winkle (R)

=== Countywide elected officials ===
Office	Name
County Clerk and Recorder	Sheri Davis (R)
County Treasurer	Dave Gill (R)
County Assessor	Toby Damisch (R)
County Sheriff	Darren Weekly (R)
County Surveyor	Darrell Roberts (R)
County Coroner	Raeann Brown (R)

=== Political history ===
As a primarily suburban county, Douglas County has long been known as a Republican stronghold. In the 2012 election, Mitt Romney won 62% of the vote. However, Douglas County has become more competitive in recent years, with Donald Trump winning 55% of the county's vote in 2016 and only 52% of the vote in 2020 and 2024. In 2024, Kamala Harris achieved the highest vote share for a Democratic presidential nominee in the county since 1964. In 2022, incumbent Democratic governor Jared Polis lost the county by a razor-thin margin, winning nearly 49% of the vote. However, Democratic strength is mostly limited to northern Douglas County, including Highlands Ranch, Lone Tree, and Meridian, while the rest of the county is still strongly Republican.

United States presidential election results for Douglas County, Colorado
Year	Republican		Democratic		Third party(ies)	
Year	No.	%	No.	%	No.	%
1880	331	53.82%	282	45.85%	2	0.33%
1884	288	53.33%	246	45.56%	6	1.11%
1888	385	52.67%	307	42.00%	39	5.34%
1892	360	57.60%	0	0.00%	265	42.40%
1896	172	13.95%	1,051	85.24%	10	0.81%
1900	642	49.01%	650	49.62%	18	1.37%
1904	792	59.28%	524	39.22%	20	1.50%
1908	779	54.78%	629	44.23%	14	0.98%
1912	373	28.21%	619	46.82%	330	24.96%
1916	612	42.18%	820	56.51%	19	1.31%
1920	948	61.40%	561	36.33%	35	2.27%
1924	870	55.34%	383	24.36%	319	20.29%
1928	1,107	64.25%	603	35.00%	13	0.75%
1932	836	42.96%	1,061	54.52%	49	2.52%
1936	895	45.48%	1,044	53.05%	29	1.47%
1940	1,298	61.57%	801	38.00%	9	0.43%
1944	1,214	65.37%	638	34.36%	5	0.27%
1948	979	55.75%	767	43.68%	10	0.57%
1952	1,427	69.00%	637	30.80%	4	0.19%
1956	1,508	68.08%	697	31.47%	10	0.45%
1960	1,490	64.42%	823	35.58%	0	0.00%
1964	1,336	47.87%	1,442	51.67%	13	0.47%
1968	1,910	61.53%	857	27.61%	337	10.86%
1972	3,625	75.52%	1,048	21.83%	127	2.65%
1976	5,078	65.54%	2,459	31.74%	211	2.72%
1980	8,126	70.08%	2,108	18.18%	1,362	11.75%
1984	12,249	79.33%	3,011	19.50%	181	1.17%
1988	17,035	69.96%	6,931	28.46%	384	1.58%
1992	18,592	46.41%	9,991	24.94%	11,477	28.65%
1996	32,120	61.80%	16,232	31.23%	3,623	6.97%
2000	56,007	64.95%	27,076	31.40%	3,142	3.64%
2004	80,651	66.54%	39,661	32.72%	889	0.73%
2008	88,108	58.03%	61,960	40.81%	1,751	1.15%
2012	104,397	62.11%	61,094	36.35%	2,593	1.54%
2016	102,573	54.71%	68,657	36.62%	16,270	8.68%
2020	121,270	52.36%	104,653	45.19%	5,682	2.45%
2024	127,451	52.26%	110,408	45.27%	6,033	2.47%

United States Senate election results for Douglas County, Colorado2
Year	Republican		Democratic		Third party(ies)	
Year	No.	%	No.	%	No.	%
2020	130,045	56.16%	97,553	42.13%	3,961	1.71%

United States Senate election results for Douglas County, Colorado3
Year	Republican		Democratic		Third party(ies)	
Year	No.	%	No.	%	No.	%
2022	100,978	52.89%	85,173	44.61%	4,757	2.49%

Colorado Gubernatorial election results for Douglas County
Year	Republican		Democratic		Third party(ies)	
Year	No.	%	No.	%	No.	%
2022	94,312	49.46%	93,022	48.78%	3,356	1.76%

== Education ==
Douglas County is served by Douglas County School District RE-1, which covers the entire county. It is the third-largest school district in Colorado. In addition to traditional neighborhood schools, the district includes sixteen charter schools, four option schools, and an online school. Schools are rated generally high in the area.

The University Center at Chaparral in Parker offers courses through Arapahoe Community College, the University of Colorado Denver, University College of the University of Denver, and the Douglas County School District. The University of Phoenix has a campus in Lone Tree.

The county was home to its own university, the University of Colorado South Denver in Lone Tree, but it permanently closed in 2021 due to the COVID-19 pandemic and financial concerns.

=== Libraries ===
The Douglas County Libraries system has seven branches throughout the county. The library also houses the Douglas County History Research Center, which collects and preserves the history of Douglas County, the High Plains, the Divide area of the Front Range and Colorado, to provide historical research resources to the public.

== Economy ==
=== Top employers ===
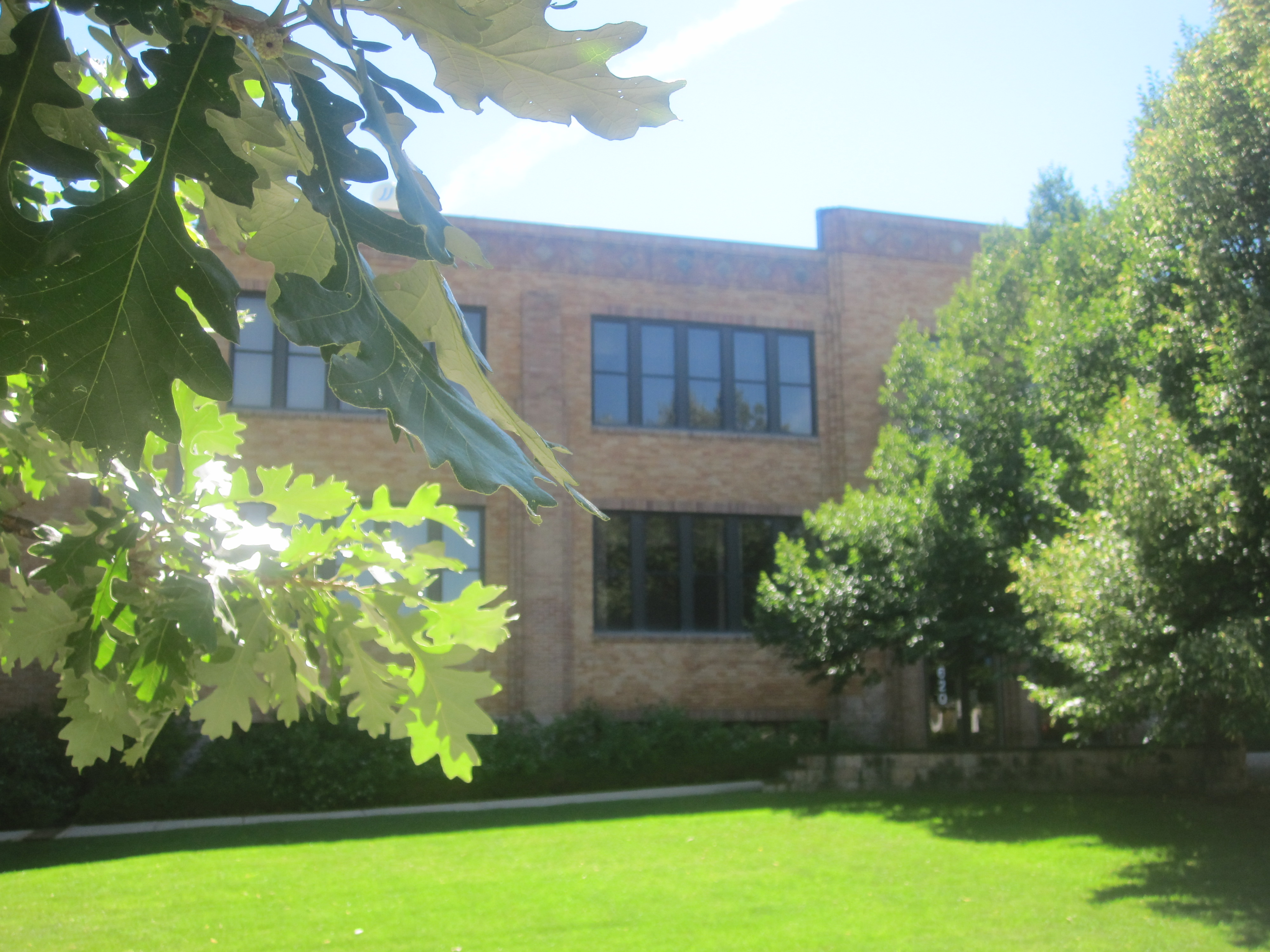
Douglas County School District office in Castle Rock

According to the county's 2015 Comprehensive Annual Financial Report, the top employers in the county are:

#	Employer	# of Employees
1	Douglas County School District RE-1	5,563
2	Charles Schwab Corporation	2,400
3	EchoStar	2,010
4	CH2M Hill	1,660
5	HealthONE: Sky Ridge Medical Center	1,220
6	Western Union	1,210
7	Douglas County Government	1,146
8	Centura Health: Parker Adventist Hospital	1,110
9	Information Handling Services	980
10	Specialized Loan Servicing	940

== Recognition ==
Douglas County has been recognized by a number of national periodicals:

- Money magazine ranked Douglas County number five in the United States for “Job Growth over the Last Eight Years”, August 18, 2009
- American City Business Journals (ACBJ) ranked Douglas County fourth in the nation for “Quality of Life”, May 2004

== Communities ==
=== Cities ===
- Aurora (part)
- Castle Pines
- Littleton (part)
- Lone Tree

=== Towns ===
- Castle Rock
- Larkspur
- Parker

=== Census-designated places ===
- Acres Green
- Castle Pines Village
- Franktown
- Grand View Estates
- Highlands Ranch
- Louviers
- Meridian
- Meridian Village
- Perry Park
- Roxborough Park
- Sedalia
- Sierra Ridge
- Stepping Stone
- Sterling Ranch
- Stonegate
- The Pinery
- Westcreek

=== Other unincorporated communities ===
- Dakan
- Deckers
- Greenland

=== Former census-designated places ===
- Carriage Club (now part of Lone Tree)
- Cottonwood (now part of Parker)
- Heritage Hills (now part of Lone Tree)

== See also ==
- Bibliography of Colorado
- Geography of Colorado
- History of Colorado
  - Arapahoe County, Kansas Territory
  - National Register of Historic Places listings in Douglas County, Colorado
- Index of Colorado-related articles
- List of Colorado-related lists
  - List of counties in Colorado
  - List of statistical areas in Colorado
- Outline of Colorado
  - Douglas County search and rescue
  - Front Range Urban Corridor
