= Denver–Aurora–Greeley combined statistical area =

Denver-Aurora-Greeley, CO Combined Statistical Area
- Combined Statistical Area
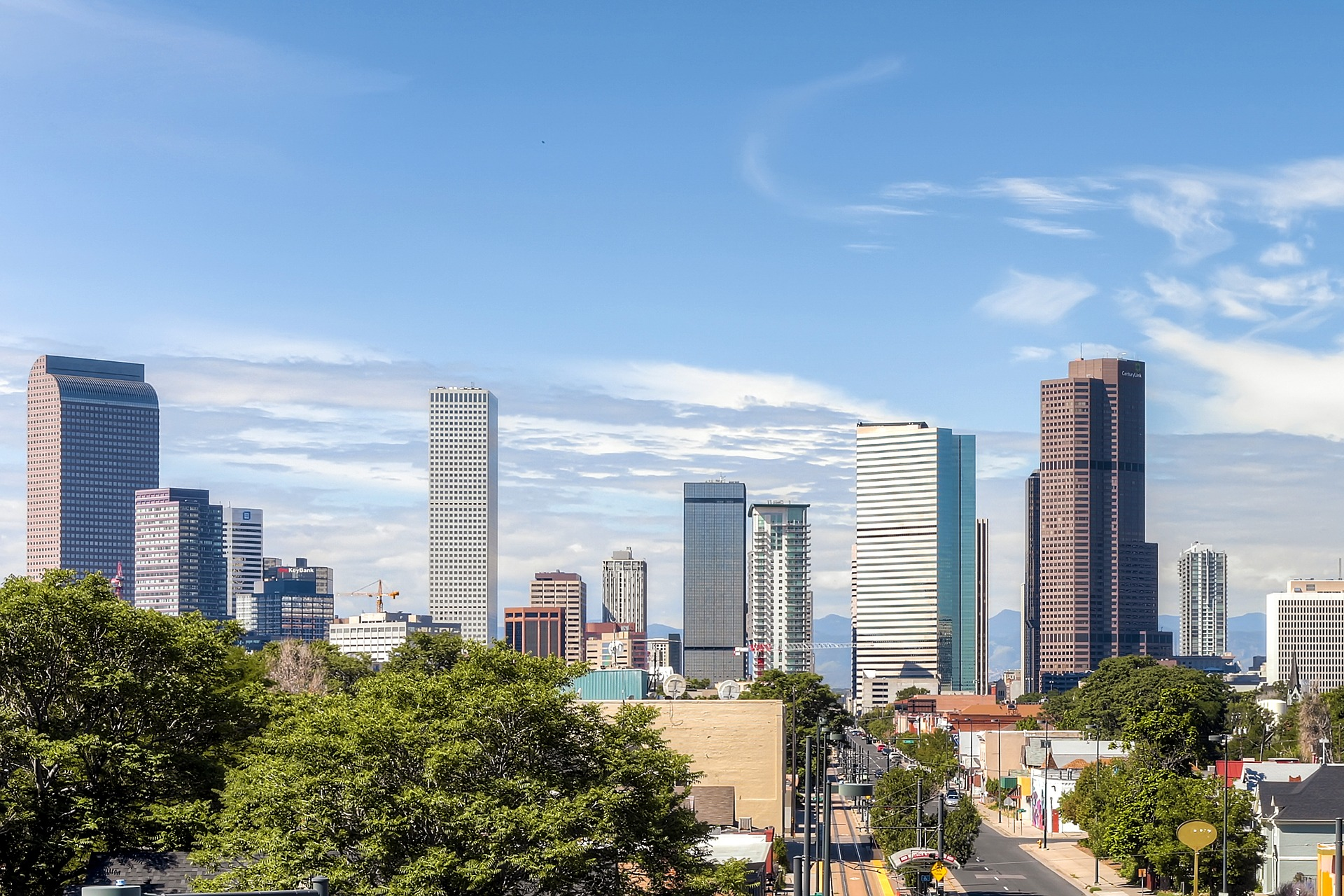
- Skyline of Downtown Denver
Denver–Aurora–Greeley, CO CSA
City and County of Denver
Denver–Aurora–Centennial MSA
Boulder MSA
Greeley MSA
- Country: United States
- State: Colorado
- Most populous city: Denver
- Other cities: Aurora; Lakewood; Thornton; Arvada; Westminster; Greeley; Centennial; Boulder; Longmont
- Time zone: UTC−07:00 (MST)
  - Summer (DST): UTC−06:00 (MDT)

On July 21, 2023, the United States Office of Management and Budget defined the 12-county Denver-Aurora-Greeley, CO Combined Statistical Area as comprising the ten-county Denver–Aurora–Centennial, CO Metropolitan Statistical Area, the single-county Boulder, CO Metropolitan Statistical Area, and the single-county Greeley, CO Metropolitan Statistical Area. The United States Census Bureau estimates that the population was 3,752,505 as of July 1, 2024, an increase of +3.56% since the 2020 United States Census, and ranking as the 17th most populous combined statistical area and the 19th most populous primary statistical area of the United States. (Note: United States Census Bureau population estimates for July 1, 2024.)

== Counties ==
The Denver-Aurora-Greeley, CO Combined Statistical Area (CSA) comprises the Denver-Aurora-Centennial, CO Metropolitan Statistical Area, the Boulder, CO Metropolitan Statistical Area, and the Greeley, CO Metropolitan Statistical Area. The table below includes the following information:

1. The name of the constituent Core Based Statistical Area (CBSA).
2. The population of the CBSA as of April 1, 2020, as enumerated by the 2020 United States census.
3. The official name of the county.
4. The county population as of April 1, 2010, as enumerated by the 2010 United States census.
5. The county population as of April 1, 2020, as enumerated by the 2020 United States census.
6. The percent population change between April 1, 2010, to April 1, 2020.

Denver-Aurora-Greeley, CO Combined Statistical Area
| Core Based Statistical Area | 2020 Census | County | 2010 Census | 2020 Census | Change |
|---|---|---|---|---|---|
| Denver-Aurora-Centennial, CO MSA | 2,963,821 | City and County of Denver | 600,158 | 715,522 | +19.2% |
| Denver-Aurora-Centennial, CO MSA | 2,963,821 | Arapahoe County | 572,003 | 655,070 | +14.5% |
| Denver-Aurora-Centennial, CO MSA | 2,963,821 | Jefferson County | 534,543 | 582,910 | +9.0% |
| Denver-Aurora-Centennial, CO MSA | 2,963,821 | Adams County | 441,603 | 519,572 | +17.7% |
| Denver-Aurora-Centennial, CO MSA | 2,963,821 | Douglas County | 285,465 | 357,978 | +25.4% |
| Denver-Aurora-Centennial, CO MSA | 2,963,821 | City and County of Broomfield | 55,889 | 74,112 | +32.6% |
| Denver-Aurora-Centennial, CO MSA | 2,963,821 | Elbert County | 23,086 | 26,062 | +12.9% |
| Denver-Aurora-Centennial, CO MSA | 2,963,821 | Park County | 16,101 | 17,390 | +7.3% |
| Denver-Aurora-Centennial, CO MSA | 2,963,821 | Clear Creek County | 9,088 | 9,397 | +3.4% |
| Denver-Aurora-Centennial, CO MSA | 2,963,821 | Gilpin County | 5,441 | 5,808 | +6.7% |
| Boulder, CO MSA | 330,758 | Boulder County | 294,567 | 330,758 | +12.3% |
| Greeley, CO MSA | 328,981 | Weld County | 252,825 | 328,981 | +30.1% |
| Total for Denver-Aurora-Greeley, CO CSA | | | 3,090,874 | 3,623,560 | +17.2% |

== Components ==
The Denver–Aurora, CO CSA includes the following jurisdictions in the State of Colorado:

- Town of Alma
- City of Arvada
- Town of Ault
- City of Aurora
- Town of Bennett
- The portion of the Town of Berthoud in Weld County
- City of Black Hawk
- City of Boulder
- Town of Bow Mar
- City of Brighton
- City and County of Broomfield
- City of Castle Pines North
- Town of Castle Rock
- City of Centennial
- Central City
- City of Cherry Hills Village
- Town of Columbine Valley
- City of Commerce City
- City of Dacono
- Town of Deer Trail
- City and County of Denver
- Town of Eaton
- City of Edgewater
- Town of Elizabeth
- Town of Empire
- City of Englewood
- Town of Erie
- City of Evans
- Town of Fairplay
- City of Federal Heights
- Town of Firestone
- Town of Foxfield
- Town of Frederick
- Town of Garden City
- Town of Georgetown
- Town of Gilcrest
- City of Glendale
- City of Golden
- City of Greeley
- City of Greenwood Village
- Town of Grover
- Town of Hudson
- City of Idaho Springs
- Town of Jamestown
- The portion of the Town of Johnstown in Weld County
- Town of Keenesburg
- Town of Kersey
- Town of Kiowa
- Town of La Salle
- City of Lafayette
- Town of Lakeside
- City of Lakewood
- Town of Larkspur
- City of Littleton
- Town of Lochbuie
- City of Lone Tree
- City of Longmont
- City of Louisville
- Town of Lyons
- Town of Mead
- Town of Milliken
- Town of Morrison
- Town of Mountain View
- Town of Nederland
- City of Northglenn
- Town of Nunn
- Town of Parker
- Town of Pierce
- Town of Platteville
- Town of Raymer
- Town of Severance
- City of Sheridan
- Town of Silver Plume
- Town of Simla
- Town of Superior
- City of Thornton
- Town of Ward
- Town of Watkins
- City of Westminster
- City of Wheat Ridge
- The portion of the Town of Windsor in Weld County
- unincorporated Adams County
- unincorporated Arapahoe County
- unincorporated Boulder County
- unincorporated Clear Creek County
- unincorporated Douglas County
- unincorporated Elbert County
- unincorporated Gilpin County
- unincorporated Jefferson County
- unincorporated Park County
- unincorporated Weld County

== See also ==
- Colorado
  - Index of Colorado-related articles
  - List of Colorado statistical areas
  - List of counties in Colorado
  - List of populated places in Colorado
  - Outline of Colorado
- Front Range Urban Corridor
