= John and Elizabeth Tallman =

Early settlers of Colorado in 1866

Elizabeth and John Tallman

John and Elizabeth Tallman settled in Pine Grove of Colorado Territory, present-day Parker, Colorado, in 1866. They were among the early settlers in Douglas County, Colorado, with John working as a cattle rancher, sawmill hand, county clerk, and businessman. John and Elizabeth ran the Elizabeth Hotel in the late 1890s. She also wrote of her experiences with Native Americans and observations of warfare among the Cheyenne, Arapaho, and the Utes.

== Early years ==
John M. Tallman was born April 25, 1837, or 1838 in Wyoming County, New York, to Polly Maxon Tallman (born 1820) and Lymon Tallman (born 1810). His parents married in 1837. They moved to Michigan around 1840. He came to Colorado when he was 22 years of age, and according to Colorado Business Directory, he was the only resident in Pine Grove in 1859. He owned property at 15th and California Streets in Denver.

Elizabeth Jane Pennock was born July 14, 1841, in Livingston County, New York. Her parents were Oliver P. Pennock (born about 1801 in Vermont) and Caroline Rowell Pennock (born in New York), who died in 1854. Her father enlisted in 1861 in the 104th New York Volunteer Infantry during the American Civil War. He died in 1863. Her parents gave birth to nine children, a number of whom came to Colorado. Her sister Mary came to Colorado in 1860 and married Horatio M. Foster. Ellen came to Colorado, married Edward Peck, and lived in Colorado Springs. Charles came to Colorado in 1865, after serving in the American Civil War. George died in Fort Collins in 1886. Her brother John R. Pennock stayed in New York, brother William died in the Battle of Gettysburg, and two other children died young. She was orphaned by 1864 when she moved west to live with her sister and brother-in-law, Mary and H.M. Foster. She married John in 1865 in Russellville (now Elizabeth) and they had two children, Mary Ellen and Charles Strafford.

== Contact with Native Americans ==
=== Hungate and Sand Creek massacres ===
In 1864, John was one of the first to reach the site of the Hungate massacre. A member of the 1st Regiment of Colorado Volunteers, he served under Colonel John Chivington during the Sand Creek massacre. His brother Jonathan was attacked by a band of Native Americans while riding a mule in 1870. Unable to get away from the men on horseback, he was killed and scalped. He is buried in Parker Cemetery.

She also said that the Cheyenne and Arapaho were much quieter after Sand Creek massacre.

=== Interaction at the ranch ===
The Cheyenne, Kiowa, and Ute camped along Cherry Creek during the winter and passed by the Tallman's cabin in the spring when they went hunting on the Eastern Plains.

Elizabeth wrote stories about her early years of marriage when she was visited by Native Americans—like Ute Chiefs Coloros, Ouray, and Washington who traveled along Sulphur Gulch. Utes came to her cabin demanding biscuits. Chief Washington once tried to trade for her red-headed son. Elizabeth said of the encounter, "First he held up two fingers, then three until he indicated he would swap twenty ponies for my [two-year-old] son. He was disgusted when I refused him." He liked her and once asked her to a scalp dance, which Merriam-Webster defines as "an American Indian victory dance often by women around a pole with enemy scalps or with scalp-surmounted sticks in hand." She also wrote about warfare among the Cheyenne, Arapaho, and the Utes.

== Careers ==
John raised a herd of Hereford cattle and operated a sawmill on Running Creek near the present-day town of Elizabeth with H.M. Foster. They made wooden shingles for the first shingled house in Denver. Mary and Elizabeth often drove the wagon to Denver for supplies.

In 1878, the family moved to Castle Rock after John was elected to the position of Douglas County Clerk. He then operated a grocery store in Franktown with Ed Krakaw. He also grew alfalfa hay on five fields alongside Cherry Creek with a partner, F. H. Allison. John help plan for construction of a new County Court House about 1888 and into 1889.

John and Elizabeth purchased the Elizabeth Hotel in Elizabeth in the late 1890s. It was run-down when they bought it, and the Denver Hotel Bulletin stated that they ran the business well.

In 1936, Elizabeth was interviewed by James R. Harvey for the article "Pioneer Experiences in Colorado", which was printed in The Colorado Magazine. She wrote an article "Early History of Parker and Vicinity" that appeared in a 1946 issue of the same magazine.

== Tallman–Newlin Cabin ==
External image
- Tallman–Newlin Cabin, showing a portion of the house with the original hewn log construction

John Tallman is considered the likely builder of the two-room cabin and the large barn on their 160-acre ranch. Both were built in 1866. The barn was constructed without nails, using mortise and tenon construction. The ranch was located east of Pine Grove (near Mainstreet and Dwyer in present-day Parker). The ranch was sold to William G. Newlin in 1878. In 1900, the hewn log cabin was covered with wood siding. The Newlins had a family cemetery, which is next to the house.

The cabin was moved to Callaway Road and Canterberry (sic) Trail in 1977 to prevent it from being demolished. It was restored by the Parker Area Historical Society, who has owned it since 1996. It is the only remaining log cabin in Parker and an example of Colorado pioneer life. Elizabeth Tallman mentioned the cabin in an article published by The Colorado Magazine in 1936.

== Later years and death ==
They lived briefly in Kansas City and then moved in 1918 to Colorado Springs. They celebrated their 60th wedding anniversary on December 1, 1925. And he died at their home eight days later on December 9. He was the oldest member of Masonic Lodge No. 5. Elizabeth died in 1941. They are both buried at Parker Cemetery in Parker, Colorado.
