= Arvada West High School =

American high school in Colorado

Location
- 11595 Allendale Drive; Arvada, Colorado 80004; United States; 39°48′38″N 105°07′34″W

Information
- School type: Public secondary
- Opened: 1963 (63 years ago)
- School district: Jefferson County Public Schools
- CEEB code: 060057
- Principal: Micah Porter
- Teaching staff: 89.47 (FTE)
- Grades: 9–12
- Enrollment: 1,878 (2023-2024)
- Student to teacher ratio: 20.99
- Campus size: 23 acres (9.3 ha)
- Campus type: Suburban
- Colors: Purple and white
- Slogan: Excellence is our expectation
- Athletics: CHSAA 5A
- Athletics conference: Jefferson County League
- Mascot: Willie the Wildcat
- Nickname: Wildcats
- Newspaper: Wind
- Yearbook: The Claw
- Website: arvadawest.jeffcopublicschools.org

Arvada West High School, nicknamed A-West, is a public secondary school in Arvada, Colorado, United States. Opened in 1963, it is one of four high schools in Arvada. It is part of the Jefferson County School District.

== History ==
Arvada West High School was contracted in 1961 and opened in 1963.

By the late 1990s, Arvada West was serving so many students it was on a split schedule. Ralston Valley High School, which opened in 2000, relieved the overcrowding.

== Extracurricular activities ==
The school's athletic teams, known as the Arvada West Wildcats, compete in CHSAA class 5A in the Jefferson County League. Teams are fielded in interscholastic competition in baseball, basketball, cheerleading and poms, cross country, football, golf, gymnastics, lacrosse, soccer, softball, swimming and diving, tennis, track and field, volleyball, and wrestling.

State championship titles held by the school include:

- Baseball: 1994 (6A)
- Cheerleading: 1993 (6A)
- Girls' basketball: 1978 (AAA)
- Boys' cross country: 1974 (I)
- Football: 1972 (AAA), 1997 (5A)
- Girls' soccer: 1987
- Softball: 1993 (6A), 1994 (6A), 1995 (5A), 1996 (5A), 1999 (5A), 2000 (5A)
- Boys' track and field: 1975 (AAA), 1994 (6A), 2014 (5A)
- Girls' track and field: 1976 (AAA), 1977 (AAA)
- Volleyball: 1977 (AAA)
- Wrestling: 1988 (AAA), 1992 (6A), 2014 (5A), 2015 (5A)

== Notable alumni ==
- Roy Halladay (1995) – MLB pitcher for the Toronto Blue Jays and Philadelphia Phillies
- Barry Kooser (1987) – artist, painter, animation filmmaker, CCO of Worker Studio
- Kevin McDougal (1995) – NFL player
- Jayne McHugh – member of the United States women's national volleyball team in the 1988 Summer Olympics
- Casey Malone (1995) – Olympic discus thrower
- Brad Pyatt – NFL player for the Indianapolis Colts in 2003–2006; CEO of the company MusclePharm
- John Roush – University of Oklahoma football player; drafted by the San Diego Chargers in the 1975 NFL draft

== External list ==
- Official website
