= Parker, Colorado =

Town in Colorado, United States

- Home rule town
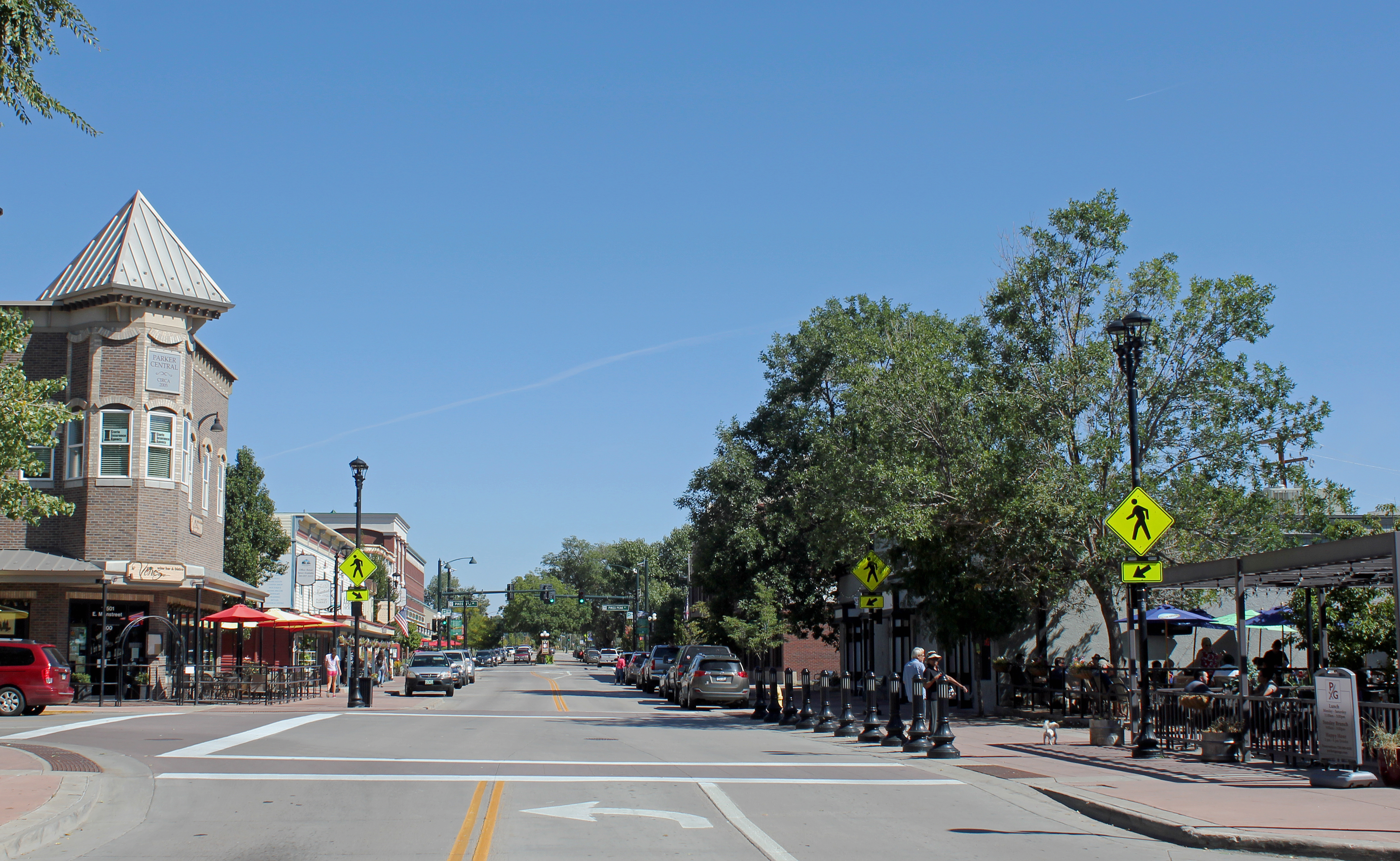
- Mainstreet in downtown Parker

- Flag

- Location of Parker in Douglas County, Colorado
- Coordinates: 39°29′50″N 104°45′57″W
- Country: United States
- State: Colorado
- County: Douglas
- Founded: 1864
- Incorporated: May 1, 1981
- Named for: James Parker

Government
  - Type: Home rule municipality

Area
  - Home rule town: 22.455 sq mi (58.158 km^{2})
  - Land: 22.447 sq mi (58.138 km^{2})
  - Water: 0.0085 sq mi (0.022 km^{2})
- Elevation: 5,834 ft (1,778 m)

Population (2020)
  - Home rule town: 58,512
  - Estimate (2024): 65,473
  - Rank: US: 633rd CO: 19th
  - Density: 2,727.3/sq mi (1,053.01/km^{2})
  - Urban: 2,686,147 (US: 18th)
  - Metro: 2,985,871 (US: 19th)
  - Combined: 3,663,515 (US: 18th)
- Time zone: UTC–7 (Mountain (MST))
  - Summer (DST): UTC–6 (MDT)
- ZIP Codes: 80134, 80138
- Area codes: 303, 720, and 983
- FIPS code: 08-57630
- GNIS feature ID: 2413117
- Sales tax: 8.0%
- Website: www.parkerco.gov

Parker is a home rule municipality in Douglas County, Colorado, United States. As a self-declared "town" under the home rule statutes, Parker is the second most populous town in the county; Castle Rock is the most populous (the community of Highlands Ranch, with a population of over 100,000, is an unincorporated CDP). In recent years, Parker has become a commuter town at the southeasternmost corner of the Denver metropolitan area. The population was 58,512 at the 2020 census. Parker is now the 19th most populous municipality in the state of Colorado.

== History ==
=== Native Americans ===
The first known people to live in the area were ancient and Plains Woodland peoples. Utes, Arapaho, and Cheyenne were in the area by the 1800s. They were all hunter-gatherers who established seasonal camps to acquire food. A nearby rock shelter, Franktown Cave, shows evidence of habitation beginning in the early Archaic period about 6400 BC and continuing through each of the intervening cultural periods to 1725 AD.

=== Pine Grove ===
Stage roads were established on historic Cherokee and Trapper's Trails through present-day Denver. In 1864, Alfred Butters established the Pine Grove Way Station in a small one-room building (south of the current Parker United Methodist Church) to sell provisions, handle mail and messages, and provide respite for travelers. The area was then within the Territory of Colorado (1861–1876). Butters became a state senator and representative. His house is on the National Register of Historic Places listings in downtown Denver. George Long and his wife purchased the building, moved it to its present location on Main Street, and expanded it to include ten rooms, a ball room and outbuildings. Built at the junction of stage routes, it was called Twenty Mile House for its distance to Denver. The stage station offered provisions, meals, and lodging, as well as protection for early settlers against attacks by Native Americans.

Initially, there were peaceful interactions with Native Americans. Chiefs Washington and Colorow led their tribes along Sulphur Gulch, passing and sometimes visiting cabins of early settlers, like John and Elizabeth Tallman. During one visit, Chief Washington offered up to 20 ponies in trade for their red-headed son. They occasionally heard the sounds of celebration and mourning from nearby encampments. Tension between settlers and Native Americans began to build in the 1860s due to broken treaties, aggression, and cultural misunderstanding. People became especially fearful following the Hungate massacre of 1864 in present-day Elbert County, which may have been started by Nathan Hungate shooting a Native American who stole his horse. It may have been a precipitating factor in the Sand Creek massacre led by General John Chivington later that year. John Tallman was one of the first to arrive at the scene of the Hungate Massacre and he served under Chivington during the Sand Creek massacre. The citizens of Parker became quite concerned and closed the school for a brief time after the massacres. In 1870, Jonathan Tallman (John's brother) was killed by Native Americans while out riding his mule.

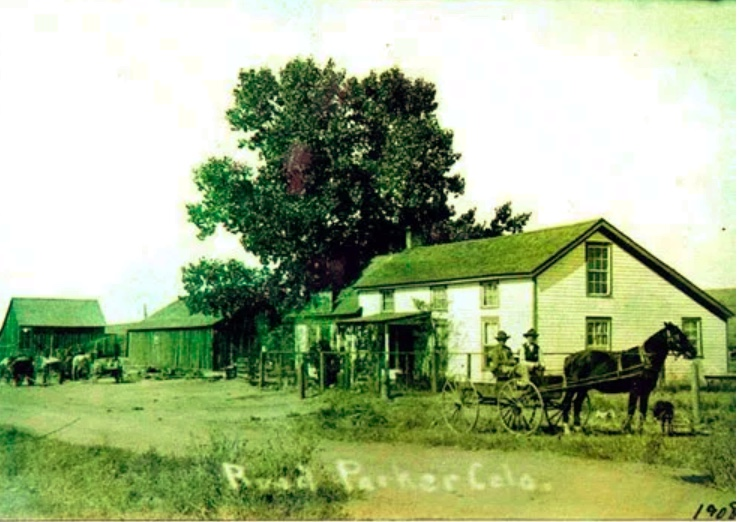
Twenty Mile House, Parker, Colorado, 1908

In 1869, Twenty Mile House was owned by Nelson and Susan Doud. In 1870, the Douds purchased the Seventeen Mile House in what is now Centennial and sold the Twenty Mile House to James S. Parker, an American Civil War veteran from Illinois who came to Colorado in 1865. He added a blacksmith shop and mercantile store. In December 1870, or 1873, a post office was established for the Pine Grove settlement; James Parker was the postmaster. He built a schoolhouse and provided lodging and the first year's salary for the teacher. George Parker, James' brother, homesteaded and built a saloon on land east of Parker Road. George owned most of the land that ultimately became the town of Parker. He encouraged settlers and business development by "parceling out his spread" to newcomers.

=== Parker ===
The name of the settlement was changed to Parker in 1882. It was first called Parkers' for the two brothers and largest landowners, but the apostrophe was later dropped. That year, the Denver and New Orleans Railroad completed the initial railroad route that provided service between Denver, Parker, and Colorado Springs. To ensure that the railroad came through the center of town, rather than along Cherry Creek, James Parker sold his right-of-way for $1 and his brother George sold his right-of-way to bring the railroad into the center of town to Parker station.

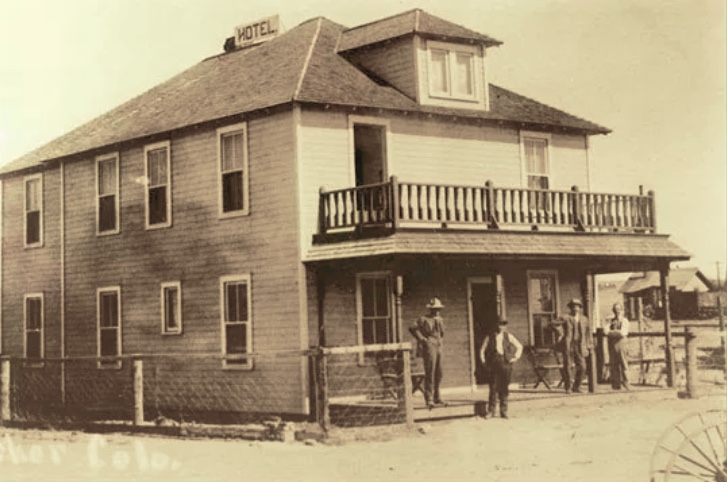
Rhode Island Hotel, 1908. Built near the railroad depot, the hotel had modern conveniences, a livery stable, a telephone company for the town, and a telegraph office. Over the years, it has been used for multiple purposes. It is now contained within the 20 Mile Center on Mainstreet. The outline of the old hotel can be seen from the rear of the building.

James donated three acres for Parker Cemetery around 1884, at which time it held the graves of his two sons. It holds the graves of early settlers, the earliest known death was in 1870. Parker (died 1910) and his wife Mattie (died 1887) are also buried there. In the mid-1880s, gold was found at Newlin Gulch by the brothers Samuel and Theodore Blessis (Local trappers and merchants) More businesses were added, including a dry goods store, two more general mercantile stores, another blacksmith shop, a livery stable, barber shop, creamery, stockyard, hotel, church, and a brickworks. Many of these were added by 1900. Victorian architectural style houses were built along Pikes Peak Drive in the 1910s. The Parker station of the Colorado and Southern Railway, which was renamed as it expanded its route, closed in 1931.

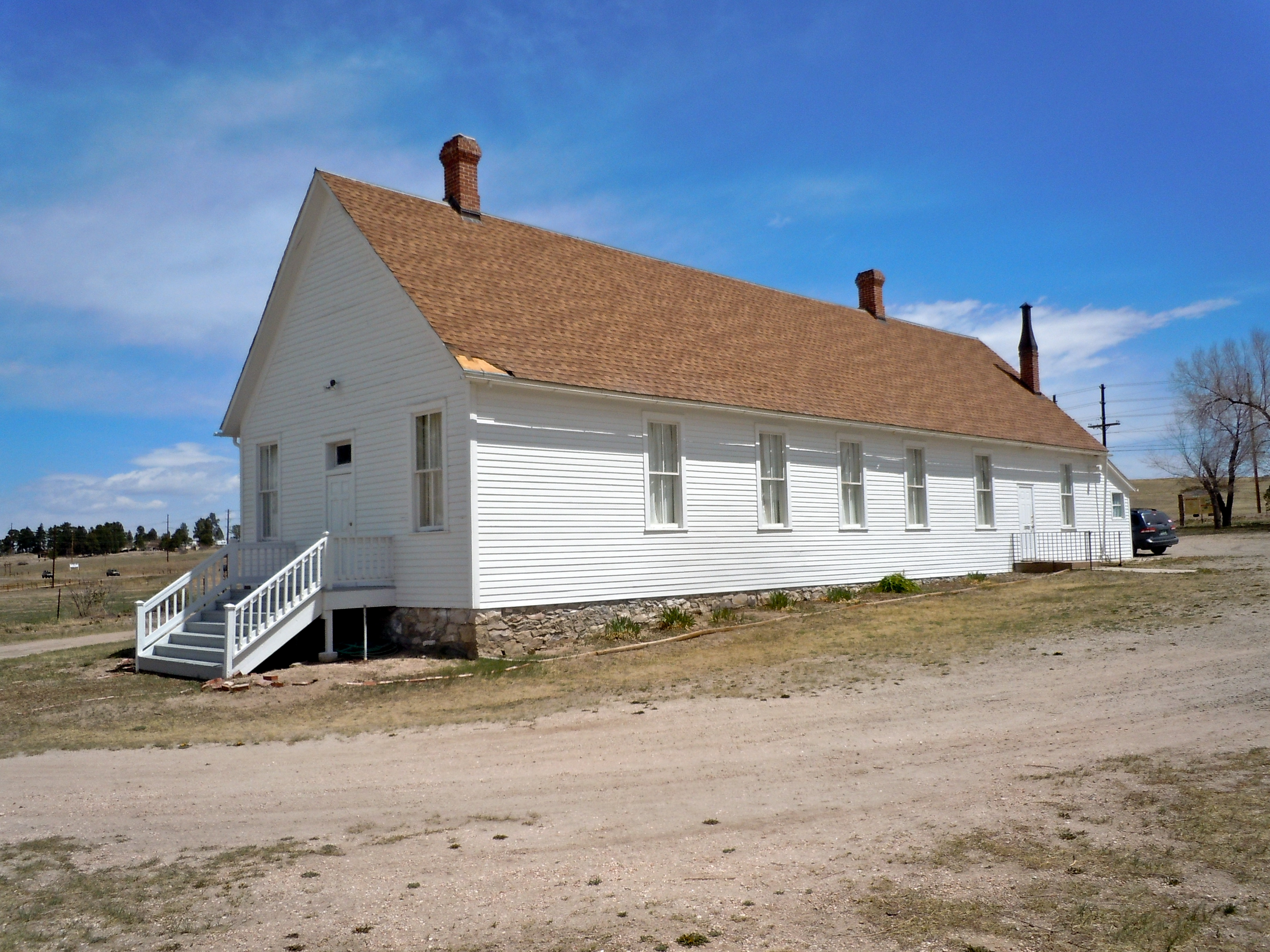
Pikes Peak Grange (1908), north of Franktown, near the entrance to Hidden Mesa Open Space

At least through the 1930s, there were dances the first Saturday of each month at Pikes Peak Grange, located north of Franktown. The dances were attended by teenagers from Parker and Elizabeth.

The Parker City Land Company began development of a "modern western town" in the 1960s, but they did not complete the housing projects due to financial short-falls. In the 1970s, first African-American astronaut candidate Ed Dwight was involved in the project as a real estate developer. The developer skipped town in 1971. About 1980 or 1981, the development was completed by another builder. Dean Salibury advocated for Parker's incorporation to protect its landowners. The town was incorporated in 1981, and Salisbury was Parker's first mayor. Parker grew exponentially in the mid-1990s and mid-2000s, during the growth of Denver's southern suburbs. In 1981 there were 285 people in Parker and by 2014 48,000 people resided in the town.

=== Historic places ===
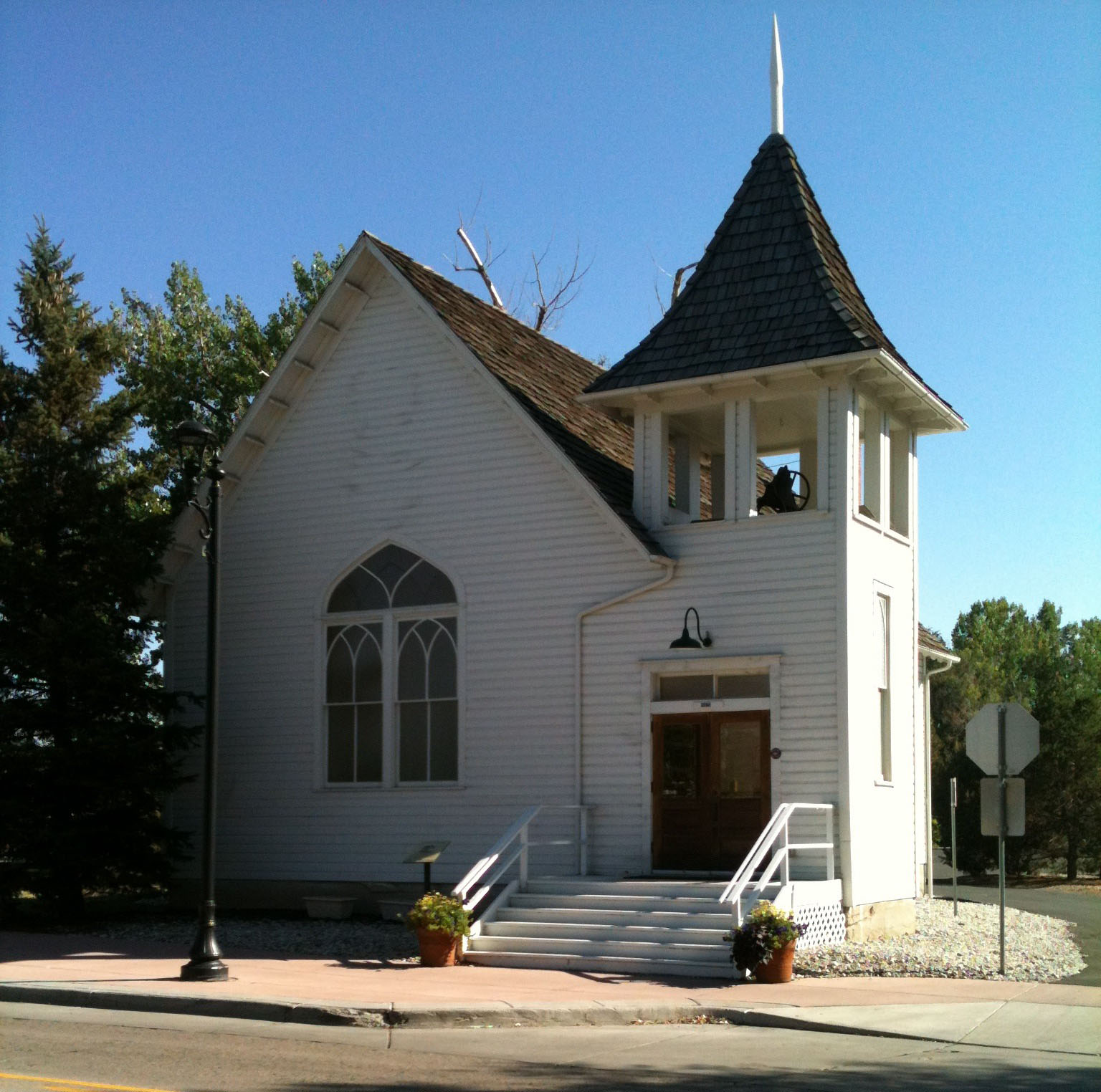
Ruth Memorial Methodist Episcopal Church, listed on the National Register of Historic Places

The Twenty Mile post office, originally the Pine Grove post office building, was restored by the Parker Area Historical Society. It is located on Mainstreet, just west of Parker Road. Ruth Memorial Methodist Episcopal Church is listed on the National Register of Historic Places. The town of Parker was given a grant by the History Colorado State Historical Fund a restoration project for the Parker Consolidated School at the Mainstreet Center. The Hood House, one of two houses that did not sustain any damage during the flood of Tallman Gulch in 1912, is located in Preservation Park. Some of the other historic sites include Tallman–Newlin Cabin and Parker Cemetery.

== Geography ==
Parker is located in northeastern Douglas County. Its northernmost border follows the Arapahoe County line, and the city of Aurora touches the town's northeast border. The center of Parker is 23 miles (37 km) southeast of downtown Denver. Castle Rock, the Douglas County seat, is 15 miles (24 km) to the southwest. Unincorporated communities that border Parker are Dove Valley to the northwest, Stonegate to the west, and The Pinery to the south. Parker sits at an elevation of 5,900 feet above sea level.

According to the United States Census Bureau, the town has a total area of 22.455 square miles (58.158 km^{2}), of which 0.00 square miles (0.008 km^{2}), or 0.02%, is water. Cherry Creek flows through Parker on its way north toward Denver.

=== Climate ===
This climate type is usually found in the outskirts of true deserts in low-latitude, semi-arid regions. It has cooler, wetter weather resulting from the higher latitude and mid-latitude frontal cyclone activity. Annual precipitation totals are greater than in tropical and subtropical desert climates. Yearly variations in amount are not as extreme as in the true deserts but are nevertheless large. The Köppen Climate Classification subtype for this climate is "BSk". (mid latitude Steppe Climate).

Climate data for Parker, Colorado
Month	Jan	Feb	Mar	Apr	May	Jun	Jul	Aug	Sep	Oct	Nov	Dec	Year
Mean daily maximum °F (°C)	43 (6)	46 (8)	51 (11)	60 (16)	69 (21)	80 (27)	86 (30)	84 (29)	77 (25)	66 (19)	52 (11)	45 (7)	63 (18)
Mean daily minimum °F (°C)	15 (−9)	18 (−8)	23 (−5)	31 (−1)	40 (4)	49 (9)	55 (13)	54 (12)	46 (8)	35 (2)	23 (−5)	17 (−8)	34 (1)
Average precipitation inches (mm)	0.3 (7.6)	0.3 (7.6)	0.9 (23)	1.3 (33)	2.5 (64)	1.9 (48)	2.2 (56)	1.9 (48)	1.1 (28)	0.8 (20)	0.7 (18)	0.3 (7.6)	14.1 (360)
Source: Weatherbase

== Demographics ==
Historical population
Census	Pop.	Note	%±
1980	290		—
1990	5,450		1,779.3%
2000	23,558		332.3%
2010	45,297		92.3%
2020	58,512		29.2%
2024 (est.)	65,473	▲	11.9%
U.S. Decennial Census; 2020 Census

=== 2020 census ===
As of the 2020 census, Parker had a population of 58,512. The median age was 35.9 years. 27.5% of residents were under the age of 18 and 9.3% of residents were 65 years of age or older. For every 100 females there were 98.6 males, and for every 100 females age 18 and over there were 95.8 males age 18 and over.

99.5% of residents lived in urban areas, while 0.5% lived in rural areas.

There were 20,768 households in Parker, of which 42.4% had children under the age of 18 living in them. Of all households, 60.3% were married-couple households, 13.7% were households with a male householder and no spouse or partner present, and 19.7% were households with a female householder and no spouse or partner present. About 19.0% of all households were made up of individuals and 5.3% had someone living alone who was 65 years of age or older.

There were 21,443 housing units, of which 3.1% were vacant. The homeowner vacancy rate was 0.8% and the rental vacancy rate was 6.4%.

Racial composition as of the 2020 census
Race	Number	Percent
White	46,120	78.8%
Black or African American	1,168	2.0%
American Indian and Alaska Native	307	0.5%
Asian	3,438	5.9%
Native Hawaiian and Other Pacific Islander	74	0.1%
Some other race	1,349	2.3%
Two or more races	6,056	10.4%
Hispanic or Latino (of any race)	6,341	10.8%

=== 2022 estimate ===
As of the American Community Survey of 2022, there were 61,222 people, 20,083 households, and 6,525 families residing in the town. The population density was 2,619.7 inhabitants per square mile (1,011.5/km^{2}). There were housing units at an average density of 897.8 per square mile (346.6/km^{2}). The racial makeup of the town was 84.4% White, 4.9% Asian, 0.4% Native American, 0.03% Pacific Islander, 1.88% from other races, 1.01% Black, and 6.6% from two or more races. Hispanic or Latino of any race were 12.1% of the population.

There were 20,083 households, out of which 45.0% had children under the age of 18 living with them, 64.1% were married couples living together, 18.1% had a female householder with no husband present, and 17.7% were non-families. 18.2% of all households were made up of people living alone, and 4.8% had someone living alone who was 65 years of age or older. The average household size was 2.85 and the average family size was 3.28.

In the town, the age of the population is trending older, with 28.3% under the age of 18, 8.8% from 18 to 24, 28.7% from 25 to 44, 25.1% from 45 to 64, and 9.1% who were 65 years of age or older. The median age was 31 years. For every 100 females, there were 97.7 males. For every 100 females age 18 and over, there were 98.2 males.

The median income for a household in the town was $120,075, and the median income for a family was $136,520. Males had a median income of $93,090 versus $63,008 for females. The per capita income for the town was $48,857. About 1.8% of families and 3.0% of the population were below the poverty line, including 1.9% of those under age 18 and 1.3% of those age 65 or over.

=== 2010 census ===
As of the 2010 census, there were 45297 people, _ households, and _ families residing in the town.

=== 2000 census ===
As of the 2000 census, there were 23,558 people, 7,929 households, and 6,525 families residing in the town. The population density was 1,615.2 people per square mile (623.4/km²). There were 8,352 housing units at an average density of 572.6 per square mile (221.0/km²). The racial makeup of the town was 92.60% White, 1.71% Asian, 1.01% African American, 0.45% Native American, 0.03% Pacific Islander, 1.88% from other races, and 2.33% from two or more races. Hispanic or Latino of any race were 5.80% of the population.

There were 7,929 households out of which 52.5% had children under the age of 18 living with them, 71.8% were married couples living together, 8.0% had a female householder with no husband present, and 17.7% were non-families. 13.0% of all households were made up of individuals and 1.4% had someone living alone who was 65 years of age or older. The average household size was 2.96 and the average family size was 3.27.

In the town the population was spread out with 34.0% under the age of 18, 4.9% from 18 to 24, 43.4% from 25 to 44, 15.0% from 45 to 64, and 2.7% who were 65 years of age or older. The median age was 31 years. For every 100 females there were 98.0 males. For every 100 females age 18 and over, there were 94.3 males.

The median income for a household in the town was $74,116, and the median income for a family was $77,384. Males had a median income of $52,070 versus $35,700 for females. The per capita income for the town was $27,479. About 1.7% of families and 2.3% of the population were below the poverty line, including 2.2% of those under age 18 and 2.1% of those age 65 or over.

== Education ==
Parker is served by Douglas County School District. Douglas County School District has among the highest level of students in Colorado. Students have scored, on average, 12 to 19 percent above the state average. The district was rated 9th in the state in 2009. The Pine Lane Elementary School had the largest student enrollment in Parker until Mammoth Heights Elementary opened in January 2007 and took the overload.

Two of the three principal high schools in the area, Ponderosa and Chaparral High School, have a cross-town rivalry and compete annually for The Pride of Parker trophy. Legend High School opened in 2008, as Douglas County's ninth high school. Legend also has a Rivalry with Chaparral known as the Crosstown Throw Down across multiple sports.

Private schools in Parker include:

- Ave Maria Catholic School (PK-8)
- Southeast Christian School (PK-8)
- Lutheran High School Parker (9–12)
- Parker Montessori Educational Institute (PK-K)
- Montessori Academy (PK-K)

For other Parker and Douglas County school information:

- Pine Lane Primary
- Frontier Valley Elementary School
- Pine Lane Intermediate
- Pine Grove Elementary School
- Mammoth Heights Elementary School
- Cherokee Trail Elementary
- Iron Horse Elementary
- Prairie Crossing Elementary
- Legacy Point Elementary
- Gold Rush Elementary
- Pioneer Elementary School
- Global Village Academy

Parker Secondary Schools:

- Sierra Middle School
- Sagewood Middle School
- Cimarron Middle School
- Legend High School
- Ponderosa High School
- Chaparral High School

Parker also has six public charter schools:

- American Academy (annual lottery)
- Challenge to Excellence Charter School (annual lottery)
- North Star Academy (annual lottery)
- Parker Core Knowledge Charter School (students selected through a wait list; application at birth strongly recommended in order to gain entry for kindergarten)
- Leman Academy of Excellence (K-8)
- Parker Performing Arts School (K-8)

College classes:

- The University Center at Chaparral
- Arapahoe Community College (Parker campus)
- University of Colorado South Denver Campus (Located at the old Wildlife Experience on Lincoln Ave.)

Post-Secondary Education:

- Rocky Vista University - College of Osteopathic Medicine

== Healthcare ==
AdventHealth Parker is the only hospital.

== Recreation ==
The Town maintains 10 trails with over 27 miles of concrete paved, multi-use trails, over 6 miles of natural surface equestrian trails and a 1.8-mile natural surface, multi-use loop trail. The Cherry Creek Trail runs along Cherry Creek, north and south through Parker. Bicycling, hiking, nature walks, and cross-country skiing are all popular uses.

The Rueter–Hess Reservoir is located west of town and is not yet open for recreational use of the water as of 2021, although trails around the reservoir are open. Planned activities there include fishing, hiking, and non-motorized boating. No natural streams flow into the reservoir, instead, water rights owned by the Parker Water and Sanitation District provide water delivered via Cherry Creek and local canals. If filled to capacity, the surface size would be 1,140 acres.

The Parker Recreation Center is located alongside Lincoln Avenue and has several amenities such as gyms, swimming pools, fitness and cycling studios, sports and fitness classes, and more.

The Parker Field House offers 100,000 square feet (9,300 m^{2}) of space, including sports turf, batting cages, gymnasiums, inline rink with Sport Court flooring, and climbing.

The Parker Racquet Club opened in 2019 and offers six indoor courts to tennis and pickleball enthusiasts. Phase 2, opening in 2023, adds one of the first paddle courts in Colorado, and additional outdoor tennis courts and pickleball courts.

== Attractions ==
The town currently maintains about 250 acres of developed parkland and more than 900 acres of open space.

Parker is home to the Parker Arts, Culture, & Events Center (PACE). It is a venue that hosts art exhibits, art classes, theater productions, and concerts. It is the official home of the Parker Symphony Orchestra, a community orchestra established in 1994, that offers a full season of orchestra concerts annually. The Parker Symphony was formerly the South Suburban Community Orchestra.

Parker is also home to Colorado School of Dance, which partners with PACE each December to produce the "Nutcracker of Parker." The annual ballet has been a Parker tradition since 2003.

== Local media ==
Parker currently has one local magazine and one local paper. Search Parker Magazine is the local magazine and the Parker Chronicle is the local paper. Parker also receives the county-wide channel, Douglas County 8, which broadcasts school sports events and assorted programs run by residents.

== Notable people ==
Notable individuals who were born in or have lived in Parker include:

- Josh Adams (born 1993), basketball point guard
- Ginger Baker (1939–2019) jazz/rock drummer for Cream, Blind Faith, and Ginger Baker's Air Force
- George Brauchler - attorney, former district attorney for Colorado's 18th Judicial District
- Bobby Dalbec (born 1995), baseball player
- Hayden Dalton (born 1996), basketball player for Hapoel Holon of the Israeli Basketball Premier League
- Kellen Damico (born 1989), tennis player
- Scott Elrod (born 1975), actor
- John Grant (born 1968), singer-songwriter
- Hannah Greenemeier (born 2002), racing driver
- Milan Hejduk (born 1976), former ice hockey player for Colorado Avalanche. Won Stanley Cup in 2001.
- Michael "Ffish" Hemschoot (born 1973), animator, film director
- Hal Koerner (born 1976), distance runner
- John C. Malone (born 1941), billionaire media magnate
- Chris Martinez (born 1970), soccer defender
- Bob McCord (1934–2016), ice hockey player
- Chad Muma, football player
- Babe Parilli (1930–2017), Hall of Fame football player and coach, won Super Bowl (III)
- Dana Perino (born 1972), White House Press Secretary (2007-2009)
- Scott Petersen (born 1970), golfer
- Mark Scheffel (born 1959), Colorado state legislator
- Cal Turner Jr. (born 1940), billionaire retail executive
- Derrick White (born 1994), basketball player for the Boston Celtics, 2024 NBA champion and Olympic gold medalist

== See also ==
- List of municipalities in Colorado
