= Nick Searcy =

American actor (born 1959)

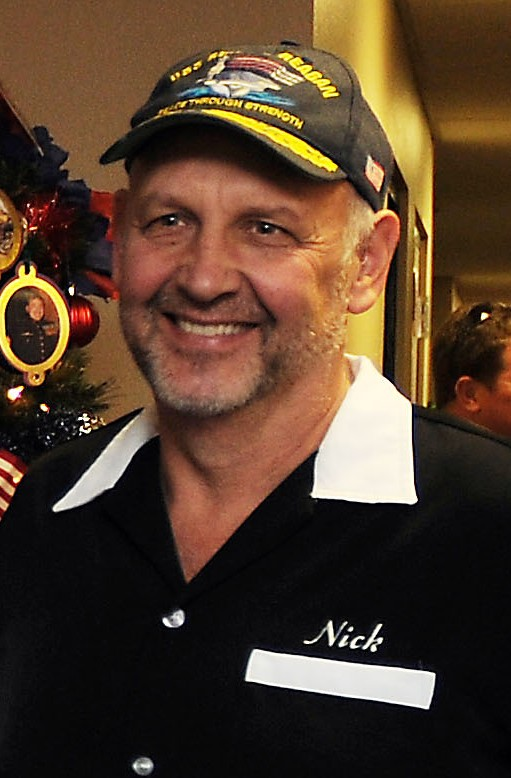
- Searcy at the Naval Medical Center San Diego, 2013
- Born: Nicholas Alan Searcy; March 7, 1959 (age 67); Cullowhee, North Carolina, United States
- Occupation: Actor
- Years active: 1990–present
- Spouse: Leslie Riley (m. 1986)
- Children: 2

Nicholas Alan Searcy (born March 7, 1959) is an American character actor best known for portraying Chief Deputy United States Marshal Art Mullen on FX's Justified. He also had a major role in the Tom Hanks–produced miniseries From the Earth to the Moon as Deke Slayton, and directed Gosnell: The Trial of America's Biggest Serial Killer, a film released on October 12, 2018.

== Early life ==
Nicholas Alan Searcy was born in Cullowhee, North Carolina. He is a graduate of Cullowhee High School. He then briefly attended the North Carolina School of the Arts and graduated from the University of North Carolina at Chapel Hill with a degree in English in the summer of 1982.

== Career ==
From 1982 to 1989, Searcy lived in New York where he did Off-Broadway plays. Some of these included Guys and Dolls, Cabaret and Jesus Christ Superstar. When he moved back to North Carolina, he began to act in features that were shooting locally. Small parts in Days of Thunder (1990), and The Prince of Tides (1991) led to the role of the malicious husband Frank in Fried Green Tomatoes (1991) and the helpful deputy sheriff in Nell (1994).

Searcy has appeared in several television series. He had a recurring role as Brett on Thunder Alley, was a series regular on American Gothic and guest starred on Murder One and Nash Bridges with Don Johnson. He was a regular character on the UPN series Seven Days from 1998 to 2001, and played Barry Martin on the ABC series Rodney, which starred Rodney Carrington, from 2004 to 2006. He has also starred in several TV movies, including In the Best of Families: Marriage, Pride & Madness (1994), Stolen Innocence (1995). In 2014 he appeared in the CBS drama Intelligence.

In the summer of 1996, Searcy produced, directed and acted in his independent feature, Paradise Falls (1997), written by Sean Bridgers, and they won the Southeastern Media Award at the Atlanta Film Festival, the Hollywood Discovery Award at the Hollywood Film Festival for Best Feature Film (Under $1 Million) and Best Dramatic Feature at the Charleston, S.C., 1997 WorldFest. Since then, he has appeared in films such as Cast Away (2000), One Hour Photo (2002), Runaway Jury (2003), The Assassination of Richard Nixon (2005), The Ugly Truth (2009), Greater (2016), Three Billboards Outside Ebbing, Missouri (2017) and The Shape of Water (2017).

In 2011, Searcy appeared in the Herman Cain campaign ad "Yellow Flowers" on YouTube.

In 2015, Searcy was named the director of the movie Gosnell: America's Biggest Serial Killer, a true crime drama based on convicted infant murderer and abortionist Kermit Gosnell.

On December 27, 2017, Searcy was guest host of The Rush Limbaugh Show.

== Personal life ==
Searcy resides in Kentucky (as mentioned in a podcast with Mike Rowe on "Exposing The Lies Of January 6th | Nick Searcy #446 | The Way I Heard It..." minute 26 and 42 seconds) with his wife, actress Leslie Riley, and their two children, Chloe and Omar.

=== Activity on social media ===
Searcy is an outspoken conservative; his political and interpersonal behavior on social media, such as Twitter, has been highlighted in several news outlets. Searcy has stated, "I know people have feelings. That's why I try to hurt them."

In 2013, Searcy mocked Sean Penn's political views upon the death of Venezuelan president Hugo Chavez, for whom Penn had expressed admiration. Later that year, he responded to professional wrestler Kevin Nash's remarks on the Affordable Healthcare Act by calling him an "ass-kissing statist". In 2014, Searcy responded to several individuals in a discussion of same-sex marriage and incest, during which he mocked individuals and journalists on the basis of their weight, after they had called him and other Republicans "racist." Searcy also routinely ridiculed people because of their weight in 2015, again in response to their charges that those who opposed Democratic policies were "racist". Searcy was also noted for his criticism of Donald Trump in 2016, and reported that friends were angry at him for jokes he made about the presidential candidate at the time. Searcy reported, "I have trouble finding this election anything other than ridiculous." In 2017, he expressed uncertainty over whether he has lost work due to his political views. Searcy attended the January 6 United States Capitol attack but was not charged nor arrested. He has attempted to change the media narrative that it was an insurrection.

== Filmography ==
=== Film ===
Year	Title	Role	Director	Notes
1990	Days of Thunder	Highway Patrol Officer	Tony Scott	
1991	The Prince of Tides	Man at Party	Barbra Streisand	
1991	Fried Green Tomatoes	Frank Bennett	Jon Avnet	
1992	Love Field	FBI Man	Jonathan Kaplan	
1993	The Real McCoy	Roy Sweeney	Russell Mulcahy	
1993	House of Cards	Construction Driver	Michael Lessac	
1993	The Fugitive	Sheriff Rawlins	Andrew Davis	
1994	Nell	Sheriff Todd Peterson	Michael Apted	
1997	Carolina Low	Jake Kyler	Nick Searcy	Writer, director, producer, actor
2000	Tigerland	Captain Saunders	Joel Schumacher	
2000	Cast Away	Stan	Robert Zemeckis	
2002	One Hour Photo	Repairman	Mark Romanek	
2003	Head of State	Brian Lewis	Chris Rock	
2003	Runaway Jury	Doyle	Gary Fleder	
2004	The Assassination of Richard Nixon	Tom Ford	Niels Mueller	
2006	Cold Storage	Clive	Tony Elwood	
2006	Flicka	Norbert Rye	Michael Mayer	
2006	The Dead Girl	Carl	Karen Moncrieff	
2007	An American Crime	Lester Likens	Tommy O'Haver	
2007	Timber Falls	Clyde Forester	Tony Giglio	
2007	The Comebacks	Mr. Truman	Tom Brady	
2008	Eagle Eye	David Johnson	D. J. Caruso	Uncredited
2009	The Ugly Truth	Stuart	Robert Luketic	
2010	Blood Done Sign My Name	Robert Teel	Jeb Stuart	
2010	The Last Song	Tom Blakelee	Julie Anne Robinson	
2011	Moneyball	Matt Keough	Bennett Miller	
2012	Gone	Mr. Miller	Heitor Dhalia	
2016	The Sweet Life	County Sheriff	Rob Spera	
2016	Greater	The Farmer	David Hunt	
2017	The Shape of Water	General Frank Hoyt	Guillermo del Toro	
2017	Three Billboards Outside Ebbing, Missouri	Father Montgomery	Martin McDonagh	Uncredited
2018	Gosnell: The Trial of America's Biggest Serial Killer	Mike Cohan	Nick Searcy	Director, actor
2019	The Best of Enemies	Garland Keith	Robin Bissell	
2021	The Man from Nowhere	Herb	Matt Green	
2021	Hotel Coppelia	Thompson	Jose Maria Cabral	Dominican Republic film
2021	Capitol Punishment	Himself	Christopher Burgard	Narrator and interviewer
2022	Terror on the Prairie	The Captain	Michael Polish	
2023	The Old Way	Marshal Jarret	Brett Donowho	
2023	Muzzle	Captain Freeman	John Stalberg Jr.	
2023	Police State	Head of FBI Field Office	Dinesh D'Souza	
2024	Reagan	James Baker	Sean McNamara	
2027	The Rescue †	TBA	Potsy Ponciroli	Post-production

=== Television ===
Year	Title	Role	Notes
1992	L.A. Law	Mr. Kreck	1 episode
1992	I'll Fly Away	FBI Agent Holt	1 episode
1993	In the Heat of the Night	Stan	1 episode
1993	Return to Lonesome Dove	Raab	2 episodes
1994	Thunder Alley	Brett	8 episodes
1995–1996	American Gothic	Deputy Ben Healy	18 episodes
1995	Double Rush	E.R. Doctor	1 episode
1996	Nash Bridges	Vincent Mulroy	1 episode
1997	Chicago Hope	Eli	1 episode
1997	Early Edition	Robert Dankowski	1 episode
1998	From the Earth to the Moon	Deke Slayton	Miniseries; 10 episodes
1998–2001	Seven Days	Nathan Ramsey	Main cast; 66 episodes
1999	CI5: The New Professionals	Matthew 7:12	1 episode
2002	Double Teamed	Larry Burge	Television movie
2003	CSI: Miami	Jack Seeger	1 episode
2003	Lucky	Jackson Linkletter	1 episode
2003	The Guardian	Paul Nystrom	1 episode
2003	The West Wing	Nate Singer	1 episode
2004–2006	Rodney	Barry	Main cast; 44 episodes
2005–2006	CSI: Crime Scene Investigation	Sheriff Burdick	2 episodes
2007	Army Wives	Mr. Craddock	1 episode
2007	NCIS	Joseph Barnes	1 episode
2007	Criminal Minds	Det. Jordan	1 episode
2008	Boston Legal	Harry Beckham	1 episode
2008–2009	Easy Money	Roy Buffkin	Main cast; 8 episodes
2009	Without a Trace	Wayne Vogel	1 episode
2009	Lie to Me	Mr. Donnelly	Episode: "Black Friday"
2010	The Mentalist	Sheriff Andy Burnside	1 episode
2010–2015	Justified	Art Mullen	Main cast; 78 episodes
2013	Archer	Border Patrol (voice)	1 episode
2013	NTSF:SD:SUV::	Gary	1 episode
2013	Mom	Nathan	Episode: "Estrogen and a Hearty Breakfast"
2013–2015	Hot in Cleveland	Warden Burkhalter/Chief Barker	2 episodes
2014	Intelligence	General Greg Carter	1 episode
2014	Petals on the Wind	Dr. Reeves	Television movie
2014	Hawaii Five-0	Ned Burrows	1 episode
2015	Key & Peele	Cop	1 episode
2016	11.22.63	Deke Simmons	Miniseries; 5 episodes
2018	Chicago Med	Jerome Ferris	Episode: "Devil in Disguise
2018	Lethal Weapon	Ray	Episode: "Need to Know"
2018	The Ranch	Frank	2 episodes
2019	9-1-1	Father Jameson	Episode: "Bobby Begins Again"
2019	The Hot Zone	Frank Mays	
2024	The Perfect Couple	Deputy Carl	
2026	Reacher	Monty DeRosa	3 episodes
