= Background artist =

Visual art occupation

A background artist or sometimes called a background stylist or background painter is one who is involved in the process of animation who establishes the color, style, and mood of a scene drawn by an animation layout artist. The methods used can either be through traditional painting or by digital media such as Adobe Photoshop. Traditional methods involved painting entire production scenes for a television program or film. Current methods may involve painting primarily background keys or the establishing shot while production background artists paint the corresponding background paintings.

Some fields in which a Background Artist may work:

- Motion pictures
- Television
- Video games
- The Internet

Other artists who contribute to animated cartoons, but who are not Background Artists, are layout artists (who design the backgrounds, lighting, and camera angles), storyboard artists (who draw panels of the action from the script), character designers (who create the style and personality of each character).

In Japanese animation, the cast member credited as the Art Director (美術監督, bijutsu kantoku) usually refers to the sole background artist (for smaller productions) or director in charge of background art creation.

== Background Artists ==
List of some famous background artists:

- Toby Bluth - Disney
- James Coleman - Disney
- Eyvind Earle - Disney
- Paul Julian - Warner Bros.
- Barry Kooser - Disney, Worker Studio
- Brice Mack - Disney
- Maurice Noble - Warner Bros., MGM Animation
- Kazuo Oga - Studio Ghibli, Madhouse
- Walter Peregoy - Disney, Format Films, Hanna-Barbera
- Tyrus Wong - Disney, Warner Bros.
- Kōji Yamamura - Independent
- Yale Gracey - Disney
- Ed Starr - Disney
- Thelma Witmer- Disney
- Art Riley -Disney
- Bi Wei Tronolone - Disney
- Shinji Kimura - Kobayashi Production

== See also ==
- Matte painting
- Scenography
