= Parker Cemetery =

Cemetery in Colorado, US

Details
- Established: 1884
- Location: 10375 South Parker Road, Parker, Colorado
- Country: United States
- Coordinates: 39°31′18.49″N 104°46′2.08″W
- Type: Historic
- Find a Grave: Parker Cemetery

Parker Cemetery, also known as J.S. Parker Cemetery, is a historic cemetery in Parker, Colorado. James S. Parker donated three acres for Parker Cemetery around 1884, at which time it held the graves of his two sons. The following year, four early settlers who were buried on a hill just east of the present-day intersection of Parker Road (Highway 83) and E-470 were reinterred at Parker Cemetery. The earliest known grave is for Jonathan Tallman who was killed by Native Americans in 1870. Parker (died 1910) and his wife Mattie (died 1887) are also buried there. In 1911, the title to the cemetery was transferred to J.S. Parker Cemetery Association.

== Notable people buried at the cemetery ==
- Linda Lovelace
- John and Elizabeth Tallman, Colorado Pioneers
