= Carolina Low =

- Rerelease poster
- Paradise Falls
- Directed by: Nick Searcy
- Written by: Sean Bridgers; Sue Ellen Bridgers
- Produced by: Sean Bridgers; Nick Searcy; Peter Wentworth
- Starring: Sean Bridgers; Christopher Berry; Nick Searcy
- Cinematography: Mark Petersen
- Edited by: Robert F. Landau
- Production companies: Maceo Productions; Paradise Falls, LLC.
- Release date: 1997
- Running time: 101 minutes
- Country: United States
- Language: English

Carolina Low (originally titled Paradise Falls) is a 1997 American independent Southern Gothic crime drama period film directed by Nick Searcy and written by Sean Bridgers and his mother Sue Ellen Bridgers. The film focuses on two young men in the Appalachian countryside of Western North Carolina engaging in bank robberies to give back to their neighbors impacted by the foreclosures of their farms by banks during the Great Depression.

It was filmed on-location in Jackson, Haywood and Macon counties in North Carolina during a 23-day period in 1995. It received the award for Best Feature Film under $1 million at the 1998 Hollywood Film Festival.

== Plot ==
Henry Bancroft and Oshel Hooper are farmers’ sons in rural North Carolina in 1934. Both are poor, and the Great Depression is forcing many of their neighbors out of their farms. In addition, Oshel’s father died in World War I, and he is so disillusioned with what he sees as a chaotic society that he dreams of redistributing wealth through robbery. When the bank forecloses on Henry’s father’s farm, he begins to take Oshel more seriously, and the two embark on a string of bank heists.

== Cast ==
- Henry Bancroft - Sean Bridgers
- Oshel Hooper - Christopher Berry
- Jake Kyler - Nick Searcy
- Bert Kyler - Sonny Shroyer
- Clarice Kyler - Claire Eye
- Mrs. Bancroft - Judy Simpson Cook
- Sissy Bancroft - Chloe Searcy
- Mr. Bancroft - Roger Bright
- Rachel Smithers - Tara Chase Thompson
