= Coleman, Oklahoma =

- Census-designated place
- Location within Oklahoma Location within the United States
- Coordinates: 34°15′49″N 96°25′10″W
- Country: United States
- State: Oklahoma
- County: Johnston

Area
  - Total: 3.83 sq mi (9.91 km^{2})
  - Land: 3.82 sq mi (9.90 km^{2})
  - Water: 0.0039 sq mi (0.01 km^{2})
- Elevation: 764 ft (233 m)

Population (2020)
  - Total: 290
  - Density: 75.9/sq mi (29.29/km^{2})
- Time zone: UTC-6 (Central (CST))
  - Summer (DST): UTC-5 (CDT)
- ZIP code: 73432
- FIPS code: 40-16250
- GNIS feature ID: 2629913

Coleman is a small unincorporated community and census-designated place in Johnston County, Oklahoma, United States. The town was previously known as Ego, which was the name assigned to the post office when it was established in 1895. The post office name was officially changed to "Coleman" on September 10, 1910 due to a tornado that destroyed the town. The Census Bureau defined a census-designated place ("CDP") for Coleman in 2015; the 2010 population within the 2015 CDP boundary was 319 and contained 154 housing units. The population was 290 as of the 2020 Census. Coleman has its own schooling system and 2 general stores.

== Demographics ==
Historical population
Census	Pop.	Note	%±
2020	290		—
U.S. Decennial Census

=== 2020 census ===
As of the 2020 census, Coleman had a population of 290. The median age was 42.4 years. 22.4% of residents were under the age of 18 and 20.3% of residents were 65 years of age or older. For every 100 females there were 93.3 males, and for every 100 females age 18 and over there were 81.5 males age 18 and over.

0.0% of residents lived in urban areas, while 100.0% lived in rural areas.

There were 119 households in Coleman, of which 27.7% had children under the age of 18 living in them. Of all households, 53.8% were married-couple households, 13.4% were households with a male householder and no spouse or partner present, and 28.6% were households with a female householder and no spouse or partner present. About 30.3% of all households were made up of individuals and 18.5% had someone living alone who was 65 years of age or older.

There were 144 housing units, of which 17.4% were vacant. The homeowner vacancy rate was 4.7% and the rental vacancy rate was 10.5%.

Racial composition as of the 2020 census
Race	Number	Percent
White	237	81.7%
Black or African American	0	0.0%
American Indian and Alaska Native	34	11.7%
Asian	0	0.0%
Native Hawaiian and Other Pacific Islander	0	0.0%
Some other race	0	0.0%
Two or more races	19	6.6%
Hispanic or Latino (of any race)	5	1.7%

== Notable person ==
- John H. Ross, World War II pilot awarded the Distinguished Flying Cross twice, and subject of the documentary film John Ross: American

== Sources ==
- Shirk, George H. Oklahoma Place Names. Norman, Oklahoma: University of Oklahoma Press, 1965.
