= Barry Kooser =

American artist

Barry R. Kooser
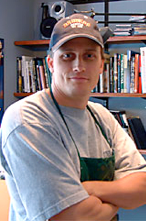
- Born: December 23, 1968 (age 57); Wheat Ridge, Colorado
- Education: Kansas City Art Institute
- Occupations: Animator; Background artist, Disney; Painter, Kooser Gallery; Many Hoops Productions, Inc.
- Website: https://www.kooserstudios.com/

Barry R. Kooser is an American artist, painter, and educator who worked at Walt Disney Feature Animation Studios between 1992 and 2003 as a background artist on films such as The Lion King, Pocahontas, Mulan, Lilo & Stitch, and as background supervisor on Brother Bear. After leaving Disney, he worked independently as a painter exhibiting and selling fine art in galleries around the US. While teaching animation and story-boarding at Rocky Mountain College of Art + Design, he met Worker Studio founder Michael "Ffish" Hemschoot, and became a partner at the Colorado animation studio. Barry has since left Worker Studio. He is the Founder, Executive Producer and Director at Many Hoops Productions.

== Early life and education ==
Born in Wheat Ridge, Colorado, Kooser grew up in the neighboring city of Arvada, where he graduated from Arvada West High School in 1987. He received a Bachelor of Fine Arts in Illustration from Kansas City Art Institute in 1991. After a summer internship at Walt Disney Feature Animation Studios in Orlando, Florida, Kooser was hired at the studio as a background artist.

== Influences ==
Early artistic influences include: Illustrators Howard Pyle, N.C. Wyeth, Dean Cornwell and Mark English. Fine Art Painting influences include: Edgar Payne, Joaquin Sorolla, John Singer Sargent and Richard Diebenkorn. Noting his film influences in an article, Kooser selected 5 production designs that continue to inspire him creatively. The selections include Disney's Lady and the Tramp, Tyrus Wong's work on Bambi, Dennis Gassner and Richard L. Johnson's work on Road to Perdition, Ralph McQuarrie's work on Star Wars, and Dean Mitzner's work on Tron.

== Disney years ==
Kooser's first film at Disney Animation Studios was as an in between artist on the Roger Rabbit animated short, Trail Mix-Up in 1993. He continued to work as a background artist on projects at Disney's Orland, Florida Studio, including the features The Lion King, Pocahontas, Mulan, and Lilo & Stitch.

In 2001, as background supervisor on Brother Bear, Kooser and his team traveled to Jackson Hole, Wyoming and studied with Western landscape painter Scott Christensen, where they learned to: "simplify objects by getting the spatial dimensions to work first and working in the detail later."

== Filmography ==
| Year | Film | Credit | Notes |
|---|---|---|---|
| 1993 | Trail Mix-Up | In-between artist | Short film |
| 1994 | The Lion King | Background artist | |
| 1994 | Disney's Animated Storybook: The Lion King | Background artist | Video game |
| 1995 | Pocahontas | Background artist | |
| 1998 | Mulan | Background artist | |
| 2002 | Lilo & Stitch | Background journeyman | |
| 2003 | Brother Bear | Background supervisor | |
| 2009 | The Princess and the Frog | Background artist | |

== See also ==
- Worker Studio
- Michael "Ffish" Hemschoot
