= Colorado State Highway 30 =

State highway in Colorado, United States

State Highway 30
- Hampden Avenue, Havana Street, 6th Avenue, Gun Club Road
- Map of north central Colorado with SH 30 highlighted in red

Route information
- Maintained by CDOT
- Length: 20.330 mi (32.718 km)

Major junctions
- West end: I-25 / US 285 in Denver
- SH 83 in Aurora; I-225 in Aurora
- East end: Quincy Avenue in Aurora

Location
- Country: United States
- State: Colorado
- Counties: Denver, Arapahoe

Highway system
- Colorado State Highway System; Interstate; US; State; Scenic
← SH 26	→ US 34

State Highway 30 (SH 30), alternatively known as Hampden Avenue, Havana Street, 6th Avenue, and Gun Club Road is a state route in the independent city and county of Denver and the city of Aurora in Arapahoe County. Its west end is at Interstate 25 (I-25) and U.S. Route 285 (US 285) in Denver and its east end is at Quincy Avenue east of Aurora.

== Route description ==
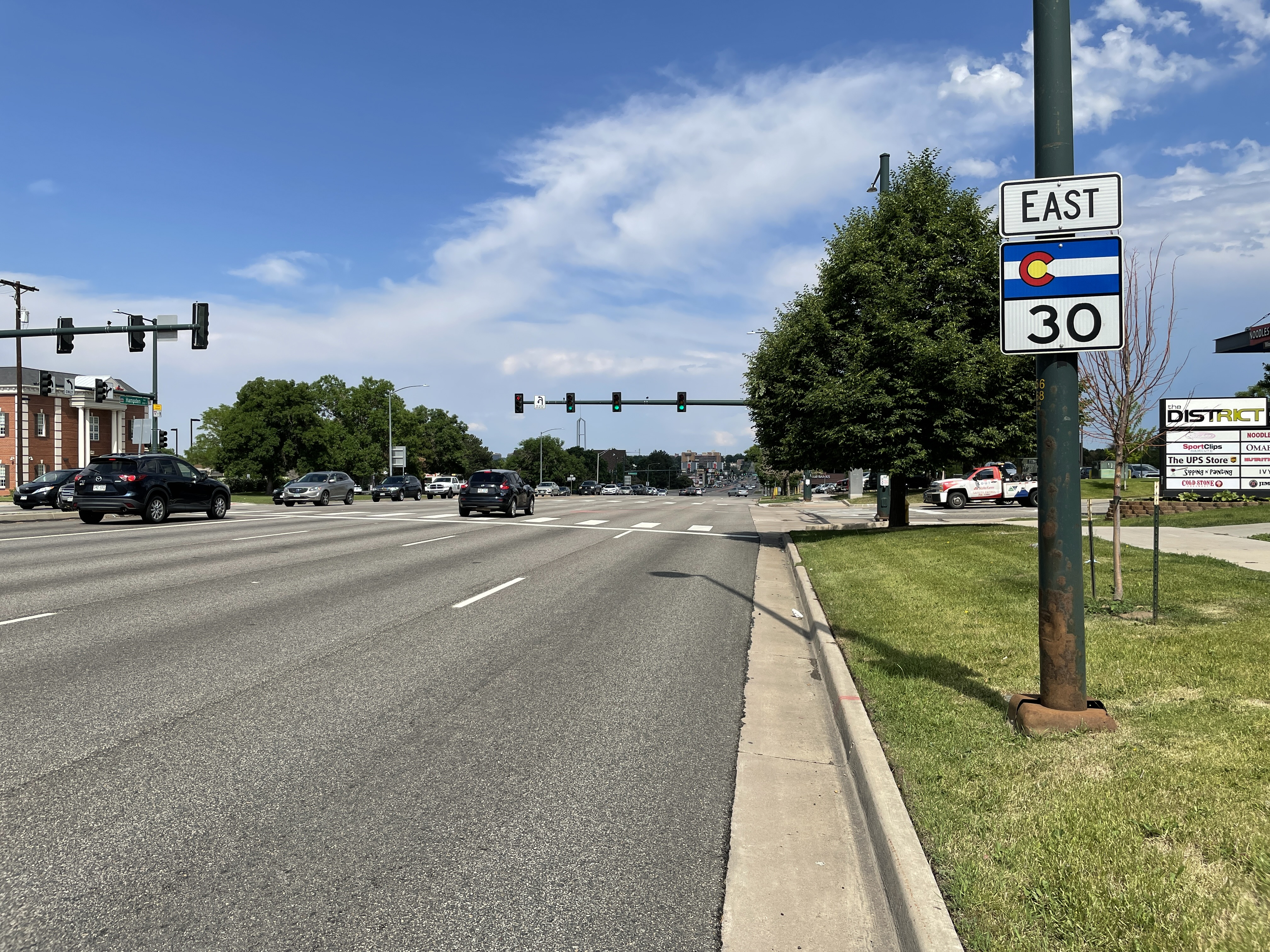
SH 30 eastbound past its western terminus at I-25/US 87 and US 285 in Denver

The route begins at I-25 and US 285 in Denver. It then winds eastward and exits Denver and enters Arapahoe at about 2.0 miles, then reenters Denver at about 2.3 miles. At 2.6 miles, the route changes direction to north and crosses SH 83 at 3.8 miles, where it again leaves Denver and enters Arapahoe County and Aurora. It continues northward, crosses the Highline Canal, and at 7.8 miles it then turns east again. At about 10 miles, it traverses across I-225. It then continues eastward, and forms the northern and eastern border for Buckley Space Force Base. It further leaves the Aurora city limit at about 18.3 miles, and finally ends at Quincy Avenue east of Aurora, adjacent to Exit 13 on E-470.

== History ==
The route was established in 1955, when it began at SH 70 (deleted) southeastward to today's terminus. The southern terminus was moved to Smoky Hill Road by 1960 and to Quincy Avenue by 1966, when the road entirely paved. The section along Havana Street was added in 1970, when that part of US 285 was cut.

== Major intersections ==
County	Location	mi	km	Destinations	Notes
City and County of Denver		0.000	0.000	I-25 / US 285 west – Fort Collins, Colorado Springs, Fairplay	Western terminus of SH 30; northern terminus of US 285; I-25 exit 201
Arapahoe	Aurora	3.831	6.165	SH 83 (Parker Road)	
Arapahoe	Aurora	4.005	6.445	Iliff Avenue	
Arapahoe	Aurora	5.500	8.851	Mississippi Avenue	
Arapahoe	Aurora	9.972	16.048	I-225 – Denver, Greenwood Village	I-225 exit 9
Arapahoe	Aurora	20.416	32.856	Quincy Avenue	Eastern terminus
1.000 mi = 1.609 km; 1.000 km = 0.621 mi
