= John H. Ross =

- Born: June 8, 1918; Coleman, Oklahoma, U.S.
- Died: August 9, 2013 (aged 95); Sanford, Florida, U.S.
- Military career
- Allegiance: United States
- Branch: United States Army Air Corps
- Service years: 1944-1948
- Rank: Captain
- Conflicts: World War II
- Awards: Distinguished Flying Cross

John Henry Ross (June 8, 1918 – August 9, 2013) was a decorated World War II pilot who flew 96 missions for the 22nd Reconnaissance Squadron as part of the 7th Reconnaissance Group in the 8th Air Force. Ross flew the Lockheed P-38 Lightning as a photo-recon pilot out of RAF Mount Farm in England during the war. He received 11 medals and 2 Distinguished Flying Crosses.

Ross' missions, which were integral to Allied victory at the Battle of the Bulge are detailed in the book, Eyes of the Eighth: A Story of the 7th Photographic Reconnaissance Group, 1942-1945. On three separate missions, Ross' plane was shot down over the Atlantic Ocean and the North Sea. He also flew reconnaissance for Operation Aphrodite missions, which utilized radio-controlled bombers as PGM. Additional to reconnaissance missions to plot bombing runs, he also flew missions to photograph damage assessment. One of his photographs of the Cologne Cathedral still standing amongst the rubble is credited to Ross in several books.

== Background ==
Born in Coleman, Oklahoma, Ross owned and operated a restaurant in Atlanta, Georgia. Ross died in 2013 in Florida at the age of 95.

== Documentary film ==
Ross is the subject of a documentary film being produced by Michael Hemschoot and Sean Bridgers of Worker Studio and Travelin' Productions, titled John Ross: American, which began production in 2011. The filmmakers are utilizing animation to recreate stories from Ross' life, including his missions flown during World War II and as a child hopping freight trains during the Dust Bowl. During filming in Daytona Beach, Florida the film crew followed Ross to the AMVETS National Convention, where a trailer for the film featuring animation was premiered and Ross received an Honorary Lifetime Membership in the organization.

The filmmakers conducted a crowd-funding campaign on Indiegogo to raise partial funds for production. During the campaign, actors such as Jim Beaver and Garret Dillahunt, who were cast-members with Bridgers on the show Deadwood made contributions. Writer, director and actor Larry Fessenden, actress Tara Karsian, the family of guitarist Wymond Miles of The Fresh & Onlys, as well as media theorist, author and documentary filmmaker, Douglas Rushkoff also made contributions.
