= Mark Whiting =

- Born: July 4, 1964 (age 62); Birmingham, Michigan
- Occupations: Television, film, art designer

Mark Randolph Whiting (born July 4, 1964) is an American writer, director, designer and actor.

== Early life and education ==
Whiting was born in Birmingham, Michigan and raised in Michigan. He was interested in arts from an early age of three, and was already making films by the time he was ten. He is the grandson of Oscar Lundin, who was Vice Chairman of General Motors, and the nephew of pilot Hugh Ferguson, who flew one of the B-29's which bombed Nagasaki.

Whiting waited several years to be called by Detroit Tigers, but finally decided to move to California and attend the Art Center College of Design, which he attended with Michael Bay, Roger Avery, and Tarsem Singh.

== Career ==
In 1989, after he had graduated from the college, Whiting began his career as an editorial/book cover illustrator. He later combined his loves of art and film, by becoming an art director and production designer at Warner Bros. However, he was dissatisfied, and left years later, to write his own work, including the award-winning 2003 live-action short film Apple Jack.

Whiting, now represented by the Creative Artists Agency, is currently writing and directing his first live-action feature film with the help of Edward Saxon, the award-winning producer of Silence of the Lambs.

== Achievements ==
Whiting was a top-finalist in Project Greenlight.

=== Awards and nominations ===
- Film Festival awards
  - Won, L.A. Shorts Fest, 2003, (for Apple Jack)
  - Won, Deep Ellum Film Festival, 2004, for Best Short Film (Apple Jack)
  - Won, Deep Ellum Film Festival, 2004, for Best Comedy Short (Apple Jack)
- Annie awards
  - Nominated, 1999, for Outstanding Individual Achievement for Production Design in an Animated Feature Production (The Iron Giant)
  - Nominated, 2004, for Outstanding Production Design in an Animated Television Production (Duck Dodgers)
  - Nominated, 2005, for Production Design in an Animated Television Production (Duck Dodgers)

== Credits ==
=== Directing ===
- Apple Jack (2003)
- Duck Dodgers (39 episodes, 2003–2005; art director)

=== Writing ===
- Apple Jack (2004)

=== Acting ===
- Apple Jack (2003; voice-role as the prison guard)

=== Art designing ===
- Space Jam (1996; character designer)
- The Angry Beavers (19 episodes; 1997–2001)
- The Iron Giant (designed the Iron Giant, designed and illustrated the special edition DVD cover)
- Mother Goose and Grimm (TV series; 1992)
