= Christopher Berry =

American character actor

- Born: Christopher Shane Berry; San Antonio, Texas
- Education: Angelo State University
- Occupation: Actor
- Years active: 1997-present

Christopher Shane Berry is an American character actor best known for his roles in 12 Years a Slave (2013), The Walking Dead (2015) and Spider-Man: Homecoming (2017).

== Early life and career ==
Christopher Berry was born in San Antonio, Texas and grew up in San Angelo, Texas. He studied acting under professional acting instructor John Dennis at LSU. He moved to New Orleans in 2009. Of his experience, Berry stated "New Orleans basically made me a full-time working actor...by just being frugal, I've managed to make a living at it, and not a bad living." He also credits it to getting connected to other professionals in the business such as Matthew McConaughey and Quentin Tarantino. Berry gained further recognition for his role on The Walking Dead as Negan's Scout and for uttering the famous line "Your property now belongs to Negan." Behind the scenes, Berry had come up with a name for his character (Bud) and a convincing backstory which many fans have taken as canon. He appeared in the film Spider-Man: Homecoming as one of the film's antagonists.

== Personal life ==
Berry is a Texas Longhorns fan and considers Earl Campbell his favorite.

== Filmography ==
Television roles
Year	Title	Role	Notes
1998	Dawson's Creek	Cameraman	Episode: "Kiss"
1998	Dawson's Creek	Eric	Episode: "Baby"
2000	The Wilgus Stories	Wilgus Collier, age 23	TV Pilot
2006	Prison Break	Chuck	Episode: "Scan"
2010	The Good Guys	Buck	Episode: "Vacation"
2011	Treme	Officer Ahlquist	Episode: "Santa Claus, Do You Ever Get the Blues?"
2011	Memphis Beat	Travis	Episode: "At the River"
2011	Swamp Shark	Deputy Mandling	TV movie
2012	Outlaw Country	Son	TV movie
2013	Occult	Darly	TV movie
2014	True Detective	Danny Fontenot	Episode: "The Long Bright Dark"
2014	True Detective	Guy Francis	Episode: "The Secret Fate of All Life"
2014	Resurrection	Deputy Carl Enders	Recurring
2014-2015	Salem	Petrus	Recurring
2015	American Horror Story	Leo	Episode: "Curtain Call"
2015	Zoo	Goldy	Episode: "That Great Big Hill of Hope"
2015	NCIS: New Orleans	Oliver Fray	Episode: "Billy and the Kid"
2015-2016	The Walking Dead	Bud	2 episodes; Though credited as 'Negan's Scout', he is informally known as Bud.
2017	Queen Sugar	Will Roseman	2 episodes
2018	The Purge	Rex	5 episodes
2018	Hometown Christmas	Randy	TV movie
2021	The Underground Railroad	Mr. Fields	Episode: "Chapter 2: South Carolina"

Film roles
Year	Title	Role	Notes
1997	Carolina Low	Oshel Hooper	
1998	The Lesser Evil	Jock #3	
1998	A Soldier's Daughter Never Cries	Steve Bates	
2001	The Cure for Boredom	Sam	
2001	Morgan's Ferry	Young Deputy	
2005	Waterborne	Carlton	
2007	3:10 to Yuma	Deputy Sam Fuller	
2008	A Night at the Zoo	Austin	Short film
2010	Knucklehead	Guy	
2011	A Boy Named Sue	Patrick	Short film
2012	Killing Them Softly	Cab Driver Agent	
2012	Fire with Fire	CSU Tech	
2012	Django Unchained	Willard	
2013	Parker	Parking Attendant	Uncredited
2013	Shadow People	Tom DiMartino	
2013	Paradise	Harold	
2013	12 Years a Slave	James H. Birch	
2013	Alligator Alley	Bud	
2014	13 Sins	Lanky Detective - Vance	
2014	Moments the Go	Jackson	
2014	Dawn of the Planet of the Apes	Gun-Clinching Man	
2014	When the Game Stands Tall	Paraplegic	
2014	99 Homes	Man with Gun	
2015	Demonic	EMT #2	
2015	Desiree	Pinstripe	
2015	Get Hard	Spider	
2015	The Runner	Hal Provich	
2015	Man Down	Medic	
2015	American Hero	Danny	
2016	The Whole Truth	Legrand	
2016	The Duel	Dale	
2016	Free State of Jones	Jasper Collins	
2016	Jack Reacher: Never Go Back	Onlooker at Diner	
2017	Kidnap	Bearded Man	
2017	Spider-Man: Homecoming	Randy Vale	
2017	Dark Meridian	Vic Garvan	
2017	Three Billboards Outside Ebbing, Missouri	Tony	
2017	Noble Creatures	Sissy	Short film
2018	Assassination Nation	Salem Resident 1	
