= Sean Bridgers =

American actor and director (born 1968)

- Born: Sean MacKenzie Bridgers; March 15, 1968 (age 58); Chapel Hill, North Carolina, U.S.
- Occupations: Actor, screenwriter, producer
- Years active: 1991–present
- Children: 2

Sean MacKenzie Bridgers (born March 15, 1968) is an American actor, screenwriter, and producer, known for his role as Johnny Burns on the HBO series Deadwood and as Trey Willis on the SundanceTV original series Rectify. In addition to many roles in television and film since 1991, Bridgers received acclaim and awards for the independent film Carolina Low, which he wrote and produced.

He received praise for his lead role in Lucky McKee's horror film The Woman and another Modernciné film, Jug Face, as well as notable roles in Sweet Home Alabama and Nell. He played Old Nick in the 2015 film Room.

== Early life and education ==
Bridgers was born in 1968 in Chapel Hill, North Carolina, to Ben and Sue Ellen Bridgers. Ben was the tribal attorney for the Cherokee Indian tribe and published a memoir and books of poetry. Sue Ellen Bridgers is a novelist with seven published novels.

He graduated from St. Andrew's-Sewanee School and Western Carolina University.

== Career ==
=== Acting ===
Bridgers has received praise for a diversity of roles in both film and television, including his role as Johnny Burns on HBO's Deadwood, and his role as the father in Lucky McKee's feature film The Woman. His co-starring role in the southern-horror film Jug Face, from writer/director Chad Crawford Kinkle's Slamdance award-winning screenplay, released by the studio Modernciné, was another performance in the horror genre. Bridgers received praise for his performance from FEARnet, Dread Central, Birth.Movies.Death, and Starburst Magazine, among others.

Bridgers has also received acclaim for his role as Trey Willis on Rectify, particularly in one of the series' most notable episodes in Season 3. Reviewer Nick Hogan wrote, "this was one of the most gut-wrenching episodes of Rectify in some time. Mostly because Sean Bridgers does a masterful job portraying Trey..." Mark Walker wrote in The Copenhagen Post that Bridgers's performance as Old Nick in Room was "brilliantly restrained". Bridgers also starred in the critically acclaimed Epix show Get Shorty.

=== Writing/directing ===
Bridgers, along with his producing and directing partner, Michael "Ffish" Hemschoot, have been developing a dark western, noted as a "Faustian western" that takes place in the South during the Civil War titled Arkansas Traveler. Bridgers wrote the original screenplay and is a principal in the production company Travelin' Productions with Hemschoot, producing and shooting a trailer of the film featuring a cast including Garret Dillahunt and Angela Bettis. The resulting production was also released online as a web series of the same name in June 2017.

Actor and filmmaker Ray McKinnon commented on Bridgers's screenplay:

Arkansas Traveler is one of the best un-produced scripts I have read in the last decade, it's not just the complex, larger narrative of the end of the Civil War and the amazing backdrop of the protagonist's travels, but Arkansas Traveler offers the continual smaller surprises of behavior and plot – of man's inhumanity to man [and woman and child and beast] and his infinite humanity. It's universal and timeless and must get made.

Bridgers and Hemschoot, under their production companies Travelin' Productions and Colorado animation studio Worker Studio are also developing an animated documentary about decorated World War II pilot John H. Ross.

== Personal life ==
In interviews, Bridgers has mentioned that as a screenwriter he is influenced by his favorite author Mark Twain and developed an interest in acting after seeing Robert Duvall in Tender Mercies at age 14. Bridgers started watching everything by Tender Mercies screenwriter Horton Foote, and Duvall and Foote became his biggest creative influences.

Sean Bridgers's children are also actors. His son, Jackson, has acted in roles on Justified and Deadwood, and his daughter, Kate, starred in Bridgers' 2012 short, The Birthday Present.

== Filmography ==
=== Film ===
Film
Year	Film	Role	Notes
1992	Children of the Corn II: The Final Sacrifice	Jedediah	
1993	Road-Kill U.S.A.	Josh	
1994	Getting In	Dumpster Hunter	Credited as Sean Bridges
1994	Nell	Mike Ibarra	
1995	Once Upon a Time... When We Were Colored	Mr. Bob	
1997	Carolina Low	Henry Bancroft	Also producer and co-writer with mother Sue Ellen Bridgers; Atlanta Film Festival Southeastern Media Award; Hollywood Film Festival Award for Best Feature
2002	Clover Bend	Tyler	
2002	Lullaby	Diesel	
2002	Sweet Home Alabama	Eldon	
2003	Apple Jack	Les Danyou	Short film
2007	Jake's Closet	Peter	
2008	A Night at the Zoo	Donny	Short film; also producer, writer, and co-director with Michael "Ffish" Hemschoot
2008	Witless Protection	Norm	
2009	Cold Storage	Unnamed	
2011	The Woman	Chris Cleek	
2011	Blood on My Name	Thomas	Short film
2012	The Birthday Present	Dad	Short film; also co-director with Michael Hemschoot. Bridgers' daughter Kate starred as Joey
2012	The Graveyard Feeder	Burke Sawyer	Short film
2013	Jug Face	Dawai	
2014	The Best of Me	Tommy Cole	
2015	Dark Places	Runner Day	
2015	Room	Old Nick	
2015	Trumbo	Jeff Krandall	
2015	Blue	Sheriff Hawkes	
2015	Legs	Ford	
2016	Midnight Special	Fredrick	
2016	Free State of Jones	Will Sumrall	
2016	The Magnificent Seven	Fanning	
2016	The Whole Truth	Arthur Westin	
2016	Elsie Hooper	Ridley Hooper	Short film
2016	Snake Heel	Leonard	Short film
2017	And Then I Go	Little Kid's Dad	
2017	Thank You for Your Service	Sergeant Mozer	
2018	The Man Who Killed Hitler and Then the Bigfoot	Mr. Gardner	
2019	Deathcember	Uninjured	Segment: "They Once Had Horses"
2022	Bones and All	Barry Cook	
2023	The Weird Kidz	Sheriff (voice)	
2024	Outlaw Posse	Mayor	
2026	Primetime		

=== Television ===
Television
Year	Title	Role	Notes
1991	Murder in New Hampshire: The Pamela Wojas Smart Story	Ralph Welch	TV movie; credited as Sean Bridges
1995	Death in Small Doses	Mr. Carter	TV movie
1995	Murderous Intent	Dennis	TV movie
1995–1998	American Gothic	Policeman / Deputy	2 episodes
1996	Stolen Memories: Secrets from the Rose Garden	Jeff (Teen #1)	TV movie
1997	The Secret	Aaron Clemens	TV movie
1997	Close to Danger	Donna's Date	TV movie
1998–1999	Legacy	William Winters	11 episodes
1999	A.T.F.	Smitty	TV movie
2000	After Diff'rent Strokes: When the Laughter Stopped	Robert	TV movie
2000	Cover Me: Based on the True Life of an FBI Family	Brian	Episode: "Turtle Soup"; credited as Sean Bridges
2004	3: The Dale Earnhardt Story	Neil Bonnett	TV movie
2004–2006	Deadwood	Johnny Burns	36 episodes Nominated – Screen Actors Guild Award for Outstanding Performance by an Ensemble in a Drama Series
2006	Criminal Minds	James Charles	Episode: "The Boogeyman"
2006	Cold Case	Ty Sugar	Episode: "The Red and the Blue"
2007	CSI: Crime Scene Investigation	Art Schuster	Episode: "Living Doll"
2008	12 Miles of Bad Road	Lyle Hartsong	6 episodes
2008–2009	Private Practice	Frank	2 episodes
2009	House Rules	Cameron Drummer	TV movie
2009	Saving Grace	Carl Lafong	Episode: "Do You Believe in Second Chances?"
2009	Bones	John Collins	Episode: "The Tough Man in the Tender Chicken"
2009	Lie to Me	Harold Clark	Episode: "Tractor Man"
2010	The Mentalist	Ranger Tisdale	Episode: "Aingavite Baa"
2010	Justified	Virgil Corum	Episode: "The Hammer"
2010	True Blood	Big Bobby	Episode: "Hitting the Ground"
2011	Hart of Dixie	Leon Mercy	Episode: "The Undead & The Unsaid"
2011–2012	Raising Hope	Jack	2 episodes
2013–2016	Rectify	Trey Willis	17 episodes; seasons 1–4
2017	Arkansas Traveler	John Bones	3 episodes; also writer and co-director with Michael Hemschoot
2017	Midnight, Texas	Sheriff Livingstone	2 episodes
2017–2019	Get Shorty	Louis Darnell	Main cast; 27 episodes
2018	The Alienist	Sheriff Early	Episode: "Psychopathia Sexualis"
2019	Deadwood: The Movie	Johnny Burns	Television film
2020	The Blacklist	Nyle Hatcher	Episode: "Nyle Hatcher (No. 149)"
2021	The Underground Railroad	Fletcher	Episode: "Chapter 1: Georgia"
2022	Women of the Movement	Sidney Carlton	5 episodes
2022	The Thing About Pam	Mark Hupp	6 episodes
2023	Your Honor	Det. Walter Beckwith	Episode: "Part Seventeen"
2025	The Righteous Gemstones	Doctor Sturgis	Episode: "Prelude"
2025	Tracker	Father Ammon	Episode: "The Mercy Seat"
2025	Government Cheese	Detective Barfield	2 episodes
2026	Chicago Med	Detective Benjamin Gonsiorek	Episode: "Triple Threat"

=== Video games ===
Video games
Year	Title	Role	Notes
2011	L.A. Noire		Motion capture Rockstar Games
