= Michael Hemschoot =

American film director

- Born: Michael John Hemschoot; 1972 (age 53–54); Aurora, Colorado, U.S.
- Other names: Ffish; Ffish Hemschoot
- Occupations: Director, animator, visual effects artist Founder, CEO Worker Studio
- Years active: 1996–present
- Website: Official profile

Michael "Ffish" Hemschoot (born 1972, Aurora, Colorado) is a director, animator and has held a variety of roles as a visual effects artist in major Hollywood films. Since 1996, Hemschoot has worked on films such as Mars Attacks!, What Dreams May Come, The Matrix, Hollow Man, Black Hawk Down, Minority Report and National Treasure.

He was lead animator on the films Bless the Child and Master and Commander: The Far Side of the World, which was nominated for Best Visual Effects at the 76th Academy Awards. Currently, he is CEO at the animation studio he founded, Worker Studio, and is also a partner in the live action production company, Travelin' Productions.

== Early life and education ==
Hemschoot was raised in Parker, Colorado, but moved to California, where he attended California Institute of the Arts (CalArts) in the early 1990s and graduated from their Character Animation program in 1995.

== Career ==
=== Teaching and early films ===
He has worked with visual effects companies such as Warner Digital Studios, Creative Visual Effects, Inc., Manex Visual Effects and Asylum Visual Effects. After his relocation to Colorado, Hemschoot was an adjunct professor of animation at Rocky Mountain College of Art and Design.

He started his career in film in 1996 when he was "2D roto artist" for Warner Digital Studios on Mars Attacks!. He then was an animator in a number of late 1990s films. In the 1997 film Batman & Robin, he was the digital compositor. He had the same role in the 1998 film What Dreams May Come. In 1999, he was also a character animator on The Matrix through Manex Visual Effects.

Among other roles in the early 2000s, he was a CG artist for the 2001 movie Black Hawk Down. After serving as lead animator for the 2003 film Master and Commander, in 2004, he was an animator for National Treasure. He was the lead animator for the feature film Sky High in 2005.

=== Recent productions ===
As producing, directing and writing partners, Hemschoot and actor Sean Bridgers formed the live-action production company called Travelin Productions, as well as an animation and visual effects company, Worker Studio. They soon completed two short films together: A Night at the Zoo in 2008, starring W. Earl Brown and Bridgers, then The Birthday Present in 2012, starring Joey Lauren Adams. He first collaborated as a director with director Sean Bridgers on the short film A Night in the Zoo, which was nominated for Best Short at the Little Rock Film Festival, where it premiered in 2009. He and Bridgers co-directed the 2012 short film The Birthday Present, which screened at the Little Rock Film Festival, Oxford Film Festival, and others.

For the 2012 film The ABCs of Death, he served as visual effects supervisor for the "E" segment. Sean Bridgers and Hemschoot also developed a live action feature film that is a dark western set during the Civil War in the South, titled Arkansas Traveler. Cast attached to the project included Garret Dillahunt and Angela Bettis. With Hemschoot both co-producing and co-directing, it was published as a webseries on June 19, 2017.

In 2017, he directed and edited the three minute short animation Camping à la Bergman. As of 2018, he and Bridgers were co-directing and producing the narrative documentary around the life of World War II hero and photo-recon pilot John H. Ross, John Ross: American, with Travelin' Productions and Worker Studio developing. He also edited the project, which is an animated documentary.

== Artistic influences ==
In an interview with Oxford American, Hemschoot stated that his film sensibility was formed by the works of Hal Ashby, John Sayles, Sam Peckinpah, George Roy Hill, and Walter Hill, and his later influences include Alfonso Cuarón, Lars von Trier, Alejandro González Iñárritu, and Walter Salles.

For a 2014 article, Hemschoot selected five animated performances that influenced him creatively: Bill Tytla's "Chernabog" from Fantasia and Stromboli from Pinocchio, Milt Kahl's "Shere Khan" from The Jungle Book, Glen Keane's "Professor Ratigan" from The Great Mouse Detective and John Lounsbery's "Tony" from Lady and the Tramp.

== Filmography ==
Year	Film	Director	Credit	Notes
1996	Mars Attacks!	Tim Burton	2D roto artist at Warner Bros.	
1997	Batman & Robin	Joel Schumacher	digital compositor	
1998	What Dreams May Come	Vincent Ward	digital compositor	The film won the Academy Award for Best Visual Effects
1999	Baby Geniuses	Bob Clark	digital compositor	
1999	The Matrix	The Wachowskis	character animator	at Manex Visual Effects, Film Won Academy Award for Best Visual Effects
2000	Hollow Man	Paul Verhoeven	digital compositor	Film was nominated for Academy Award for Best Visual Effects
2000	Bless the Child	Chuck Russell	lead animator	
2000	Cast Away	Robert Zemeckis	bonsai compositor	
2001	Black Hawk Down	Ridley Scott	CG artist	
2002	Minority Report	Steven Spielberg	CG artist at Asylum Visual Effects	Film nominated for BAFTA Award for Best Special Visual Effects
2002	Stuart Little 2	Rob Minkoff	cloth dynamics	Film won Visual Effects Society's Best Character Animation in an Animated Feature
2002	The Master of Disguise	Perry Andelin Blake	CG artist	
2002	Phone Booth	Joel Schumacher	CG artist at Asylum Visual Effects	
2002	The Ring	Gore Verbinski	Animator at Asylum Visual Effects	
2002	Catch Me If You Can	Steven Spielberg	CG artist at Asylum Visual Effects	
2003	Levity	Ed Solomon	Animator at Asylum Visual Effects	
2003	Down with Love	Peyton Reed	Animator at Asylum Visual Effects	
2003	Charlie's Angels: Full Throttle	McG	Animator at Asylum Visual Effects	
2003	Master and Commander: The Far Side of the World	Peter Weir	Lead Animator	Film nominated for Academy Award for Best Visual Effects
2004	National Treasure	Jon Turteltaub	Animator at Asylum Visual Effects	
2005	Sky High	Mike Mitchell	Lead Animator at Asylum Visual Effects	
2008	A Night at the Zoo (Short)	Michael Hemschoot; Sean Bridgers	Producer, director	Co-producer, Co-Director with Sean Bridgers
2012	The Birthday Present (Short)	Michael Hemschoot; Sean Bridgers	Co-Director, Digital Effects, Editor	Co-Director with Sean Bridgers
2012	The ABCs of Death	Various	Visual effects with Worker Studio	For segment "E" directed by Angela Bettis
2017	Camping à la Bergman (Short)	Michael Hemschoot	Director with Worker Studio	Short Film inspired by Ingmar Bergman
2017	Arkansas Traveler	Michael Hemschoot; Sean Bridgers	Co-Director, Editor, Visual Effects	Co-Director with Sean Bridgers

== See also ==
- John H. Ross
- Sean Bridgers
- Barry Kooser
- Worker Studio
