= Ruth Memorial Methodist Episcopal Church =

Historic church in Colorado, United States

- U.S. National Register of Historic Places
- Colorado State Register of Historic Properties
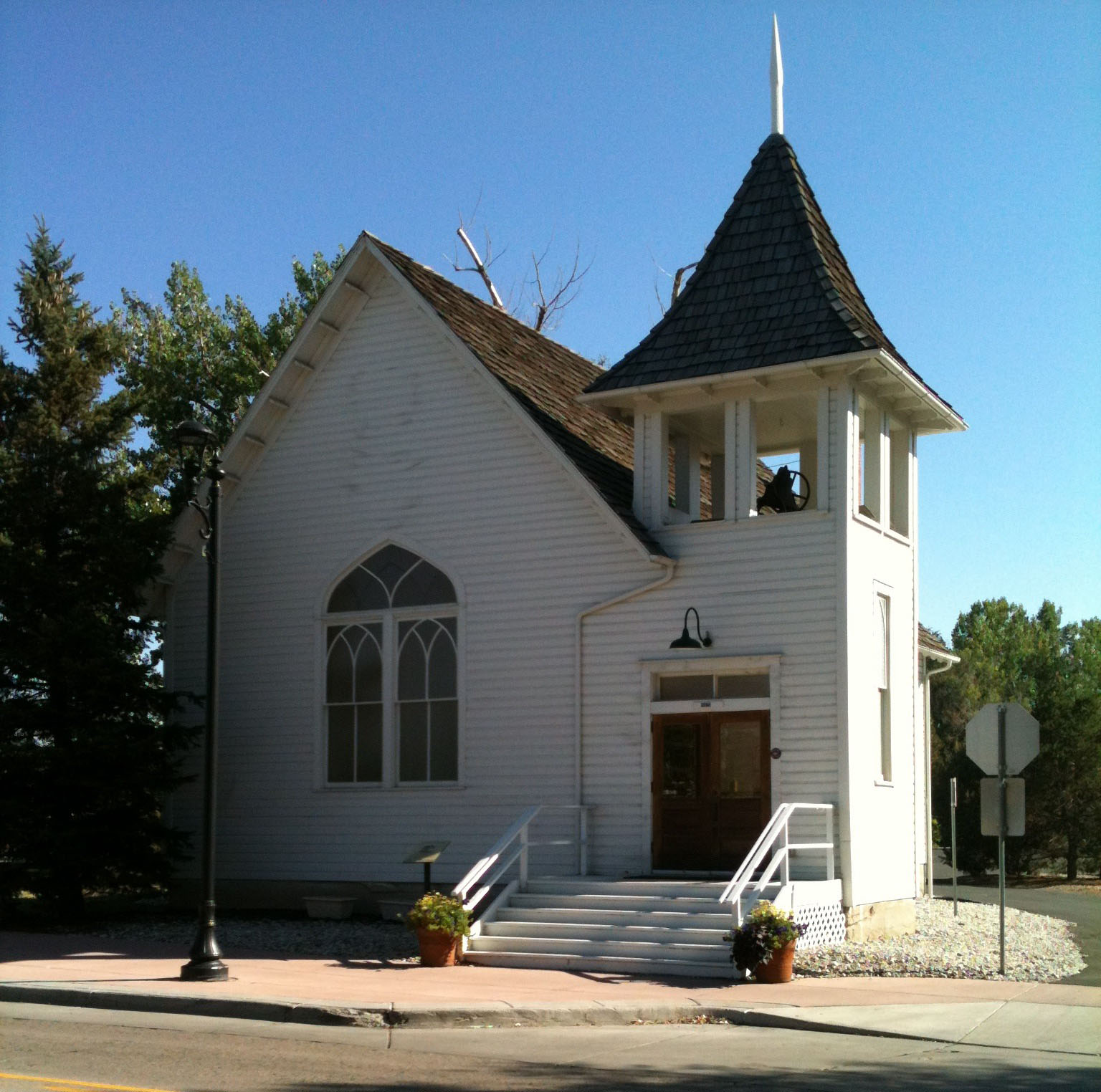

- Location within Colorado Location within the United States
- Location: 19670 E. Mainstreet, Parker, Colorado
- Coordinates: 39°31′5″N 104°45′34″W
- Area: less than one acre
- Built: 1913
- Architect: Holmes, William
- Architectural style: Late Gothic Revival
- NRHP reference No.: 89000332
- CSRHP No.: 5DA.890
- Added to NRHP: May 1, 1989

The Ruth Memorial Methodist Episcopal Church, also known as Parker United Methodist Church, is a historic church at 19670 E. Mainstreet in Parker, Colorado. It was built in 1913 and was added to the National Register in 1989.

It was deemed notable on architectural grounds:

Architecturally, this structure is an outstanding example of the type of building that was constructed by early pioneers for their worship services. Since no significant structural changes have been made to the exterior, the building is an outstanding example of the construction style of this era. This structure also stands as the center of non-sectarian religious activities in the area. It is significant to the history of the area as the first church built in Parker and the only unaltered church building remaining within the Parker town limits.

== See also ==
- National Register of Historic Places listings in Douglas County, Colorado
