= Apple Jack =

Apple Jack (aka The Legend of Apple Jack)
- Directed by: Mark Whiting
- Written by: Mark Whiting
- Produced by: Daniel Wulkan; Ran Barker (line)
- Starring: Randy Travis; Sean Bridgers; Ron McCoy; Gene Dynarski; Walton Goggins; Cole Sprouse; Dylan Sprouse; Orson Welles; Mark Whiting
- Music by: Toby Dammit
- Distributed by: Tranquility Pictures
- Release date: 2003
- Running time: 16 minutes
- Country: United States
- Language: English

Apple Jack or The Legend of Apple Jack is a 2003 American short film directed by Mark Whiting, and produced by Tranquility Pictures. The filming was performed on Sable Ranch, Canyon Country, California.

== Premise ==
On October 30, 1938, UFO reports about sightings over the United States are heard on CBS radio, and members of a neighborhood gets ready to fight the incoming extraterrestrials. That same night, two notorious criminals run away and are never heard from again.

== Cast ==
- Randy Travis - Narrator (voice)
- Sean Bridgers - Les Danyou
- Ron McCoy - Sherman Pyne
- Gene Dynarski - Helmut Jitters
- Walton Goggins - Moe Danyou
- Cole Sprouse - Jack Pyne
- Dylan Sprouse - Jack Pyne
- Orson Welles - (voice) (archive footage)
- Mark Whiting - Prison Guard (voice)

== Awards ==
- Film Festival awards
  - Won, L.A. Shorts Fest, 2003, (Mark Whiting)
  - Won, Deep Ellum Film Festival, 2004, for Best Short Film (Mark Whiting)
  - Won, Deep Ellum Film Festival, 2004, for Best Comedy Short (Mark Whiting)
