= Pike's Peak Grange No. 163 =

Historic building in Colorado, US

- U.S. National Register of Historic Places
- Colorado State Register of Historic Properties
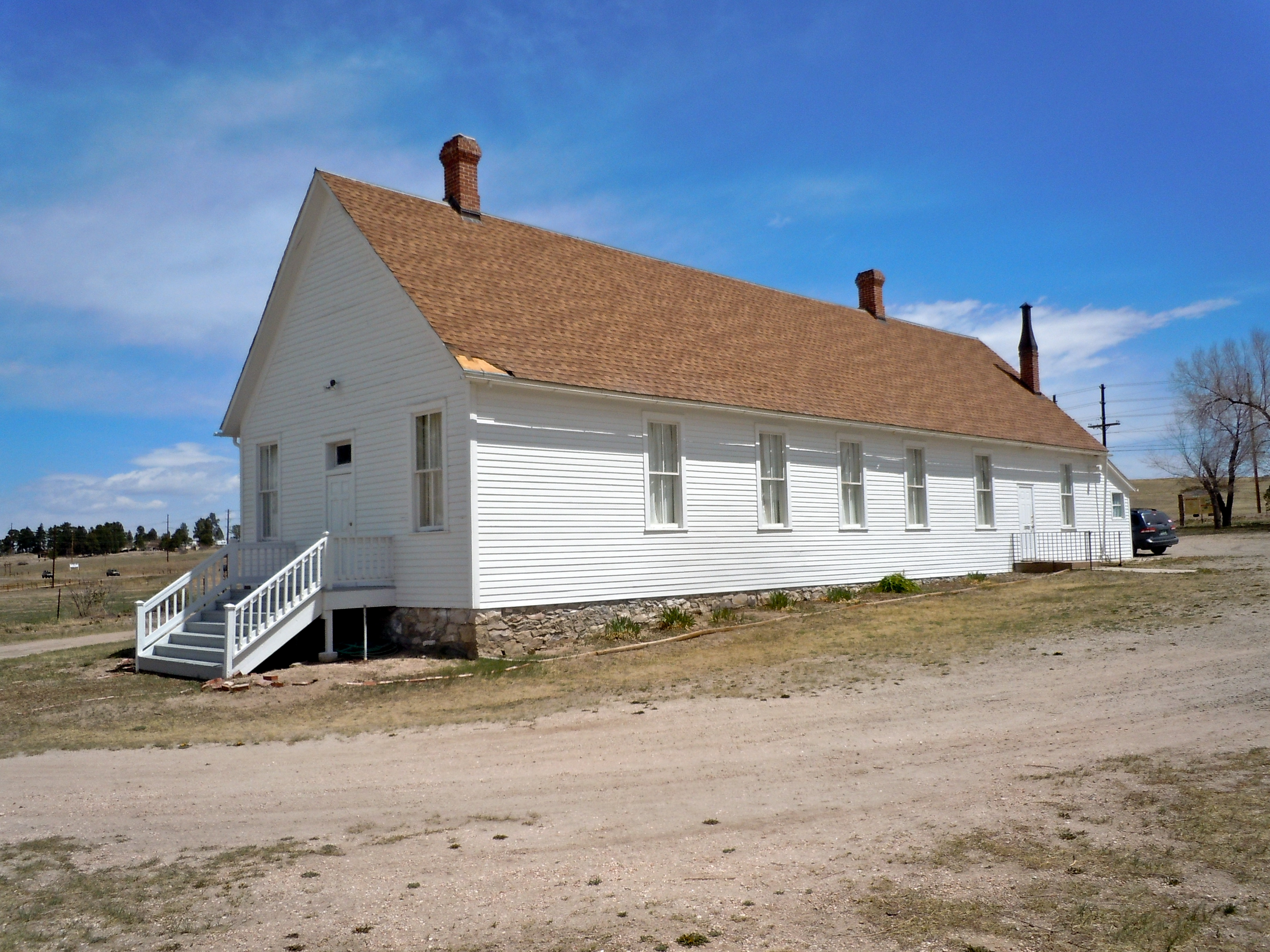

- Location within Colorado Location within the United States
- Nearest city: 3093 N. State Hwy 83, Franktown, Colorado
- Coordinates: 39°24′32″N 104°45′42″W
- Built: 1909
- Architectural style: Late 19th and Early 20th Century American Movements, Vernacular wood frame
- NRHP reference No.: 90001502
- CSRHP No.: 5DA.341
- Added to NRHP: October 01, 1990

Pike's Peak Grange No. 163 is an historic Grange hall located at 3093 N. State Highway 83 in Franktown, Colorado. Pike's Peak Grange No. 163 was organized in 1908 and its meeting hall was built the next year. It was the successor to Fonder Grange founded in Franktown in 1875.

On October 1, 1990, Pike's Peak Grange No. 163 was added to the National Register of Historic Places.

== See also ==
- National Register of Historic Places listings in Douglas County, Colorado
