= Arkansas Traveler (web series) =

- Genre: Drama, Western
- Written by: Sean Bridgers
- Directed by: Sean Bridgers; Michael Hemschoot
- Starring: Garret Dillahunt; Angela Bettis; Sean Bridgers
- Composers: Jason Cangialosi; Paul Oehlers
- Country of origin: United States
- Original language: English
- No. of seasons: 1
- No. of episodes: 6

Production
- Producers: Michael Hemschoot; Sean Bridgers; Ed Leydecker; Shane Seley
- Cinematography: Shane Seley
- Editor: Michael Hemschoot
- Running time: 3–6 minutes
- Production company: Travelin' Productions

Original release
- Release: June 14, 2017 – present

Arkansas Traveler is an American indie Western web series written by American actor and screenwriter Sean Bridgers, and co-directed with Michael Hemschoot. The series cast includes Garret Dillahunt, Angela Bettis and Bridgers. It premiered on Digital distribution platforms YouTube and Vimeo on June 14, 2017 with the first of six episodes, "Enter the Traveler"

== Cast ==
Role	Actor	Episodes
Wayland McGlawhorn	Garret Dillahunt	1–6
Myrtle	Angela Bettis	1, 2, 4, 5, 6
John Bones	Sean Bridgers	2, 3, 6
The Tavern Keep	Andre du Broc	1, 4, 5
Ezra P. Roscoe (The Baldman)	W. Scott Mason	2, 4, 5
Carpetbagger	Gregg Higginbotham	5

== Production ==
In 2010 the filmmakers produced an original teaser for a feature film based on Bridger's screenplay with the web series cast. Principal photography was conducted in and around Kansas City. Post production for the teaser and also the re-packaging of the footage as the 2017 web series was conducted by Michael Hemschoot in Travelin Production's Colorado facilities. The resulting 10-minute series was shown at the 2010 Little Rock Film Festival.

Bridgers' original screenplay for the feature film the series is based on has received praise from the series star, Garret Dillahunt, who said, "I think it is one of the most beautiful scripts I've read in the past decade." Fellow Deadwood cast member, Ray McKinnon also said it was one of the best un-produced scripts he's read in the past decade.

In a 2017 interview, Bridgers said Travelin' Productions is working towards making Arkansas Traveler a feature film or to continue the web series.

== Episodes ==
No.	Title	Directed by	Written by	Original release date
1	"Enter the Traveler"	Sean Bridgers & Michael Hemschoot	Sean Bridgers	June 14, 2017
Indian Territories, 1865 – a lone traveler, Wayland McGlawhorn (Dillahunt), ambushes and kills several men at a campfire for unknown reasons. In Missouri, months earlier, as the traveler visits a tavern, he offers a lady (Bettis) a drink.
2	"John Bones, You Know..."	Sean Bridgers & Michael Hemschoot	Sean Bridgers	June 21, 2017
Wayland (Dillahunt) wakes in a Union prison camp and is greeted by a mysterious stranger (Bridgers). Myrtle (Bettis) opens up to Wayland about her losses during the war, until a booming voice from upstairs interrupts them, prompting Wayland to ready his trigger finger.
3	"I Was with Them When They Passed"	Sean Bridgers & Michael Hemschoot	Sean Bridgers	June 28, 2017
Back in the Union prison camp, the mysterious stranger, John Bones (Bridgers) talks in riddles to Wayland (Dillahunt), while laying out a plan for escape from Rock Island. Bones' offer to help Wayland get home to Arkansas comes at a price.
4	"Wake a Sleeping Giant"	Sean Bridgers & Michael Hemschoot	Sean Bridgers	July 5, 2017
After following John Bones' (Bridgers) plan for escape from Rock Island, Wayland is on the run from Union patrols. Back in the tavern, Wayland (Dillahunt) comes face to face with Myrtle's (Bettis) captor, the menacing Baldman, Ezra P. Roscoe (Mason).
5	"Well, Mr. President"	Sean Bridgers & Michael Hemschoot	Sean Bridgers	July 12, 2017
On the run from Union soldiers, Wayland (Dillahunt) stumbles across a timid Carpetbagger who unwittingly provides opportunity for Wayland's cover. Later, a deadly confrontation crescendos in the Baldman's lair between Wayland and Ezra P. Roscoe (Mason), in which Myrtle finds opportunity.
6	"You can't ride with me"	Sean Bridgers & Michael Hemschoot	Sean Bridgers	July 19, 2017
Liberated from the Baldman, Myrtle (Bettis) has decided to join Wayland (Dillahunt) on his journey home to Arkansas, whether he likes it or not. We later see Wayland, masked, and alone on his horse as the sinister voice of John Bones (Bridgers) booms over the landscape and a thundering storm.

== Reception ==
Sam Gutelle, reviewed the series for Tubefilter, writing: "Thanks to its smooth-talking, whiskey-drinking, gun-slinging elements, Arkansas Traveler contains everything it needs to appeal to the western fans who are its target audience. At the same time, its washed out, low-lit style brings something new to the genre..."

Laura Beck, in The Village Voice, included the series in her "...TV Not to Miss..." piece, writing: "...this Civil War–era tale stars the ever-wonderful Garret Dillahunt and Angela Bettis alongside [Sean] Bridgers, and it’s got tons of gun slinging and whiskey drinking, as you might expect from a production with serious Deadwood roots. I have a feeling this will appeal to fans of the departed HBO series and it’s flying a bit under the radar, so consider this a PSA to watch it ASAP."
