= Franktown, Colorado =

Unincorporated community in Colorado, US

- Census-designated place
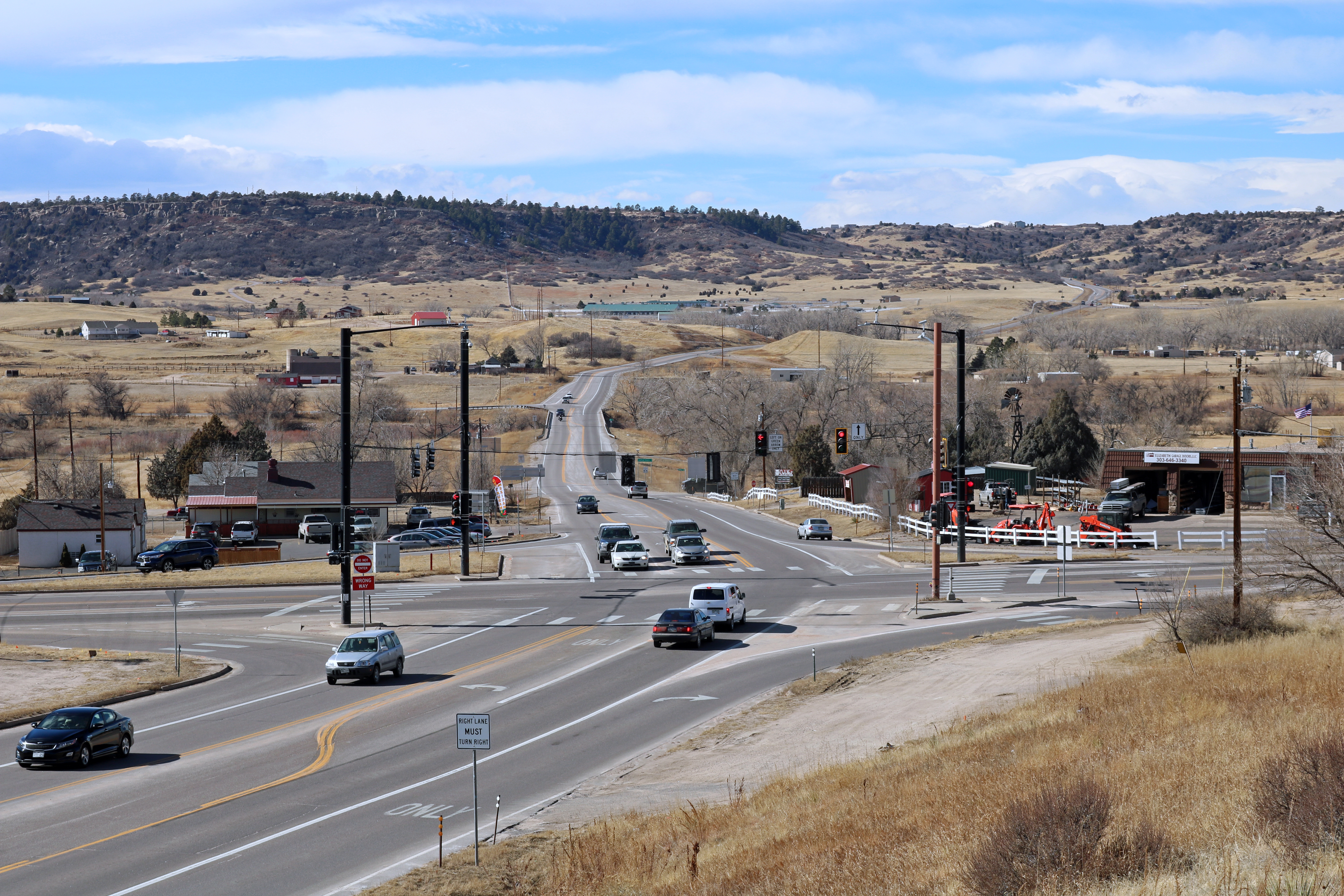
- Franktown and the intersection of State Highway 83 and State Highway 86

- Location of the Franktown CDP in Douglas County, Colorado
- Coordinates: 39°23′26″N 104°44′55″W
- Country: United States
- State: Colorado
- County: Douglas
- Established: July 3, 1877

Government
  - Type: Unincorporated community

Area
  - Total: 2.958 sq mi (7.661 km^{2})
  - Land: 2.944 sq mi (7.625 km^{2})
  - Water: 0.014 sq mi (0.036 km^{2})
- Elevation: 6,198 ft (1,889 m)

Population (2020)
  - Total: 409
  - Density: 139/sq mi (53.6/km^{2})
- Time zone: UTC-7 (MST)
  - Summer (DST): UTC-6 (MDT)
- ZIP Code: 80116
- Area codes: 303 & 720
- GNIS feature ID: 2408255

Franktown is an unincorporated town, a post office, and a census-designated place (CDP) located in and governed by Douglas County, Colorado, United States. The CDP is a part of the Denver–Aurora–Lakewood, CO Metropolitan Statistical Area. The Franktown post office has the ZIP Code 80116. At the 2020 census, the population of the Franktown CDP was 409.

== History ==
Franktown is named for James Frank Gardner, a prospector who built a cabin 2.9 miles (4.7 km) north of the present location of Franktown in 1859 that became known as Frankstown in the Kansas Territory (also in the extralegal Jefferson Territory.) The Territory of Colorado was created on February 28, 1861, and the new territory created Douglas County on November 1, 1861, with Frankstown as the first county seat. On September 8, 1862, the former Russellville post office moved to Frankstown. (Russellville, 1.6 miles (2.6 km) southeast of the present location of Franktown, had been settled by members of the William Greeneberry Russell Party in 1858.)

In 1864, the county seat was moved south to California Ranch (at the present location of Franktown), a popular rest stop on the busy Jimmy Camp Trail (which followed Cherry Creek north to Denver.) The residents and post office of Frankstown soon followed to California Ranch and the new post office took the name Franktown, Colorado, although the name Frankstown persisted. The Denver & Rio Grande Railroad reached the new town of Colorado Springs on October 27, 1871, and traffic on the Jimmy Camp Trail rapidly subsided. In 1874, Douglas County moved its county seat to the new town of Castle Rock on the railroad. Despite losing the county seat, Frankstown remained a ranching and farming hub, held together by its church, school, grange, and handful of businesses. In 1885, the Town of Frankstown incorporated. During the twentieth century, no more than a hundred people called it home.

Even as suburban sprawl surrounded it at the turn of the millennium, Franktown resisted efforts to develop, maintaining a distinctly rural identity. On November 14, 2007, the Colorado Department of State declared the government of the Town of Frankstown officially abandoned and Franktown became an unincorporated community.

=== Grange ===
Franktown's strong agricultural roots made it a natural fit for The Grange, a cooperative farmers' movement that swept rural America in the mid-1870s. Several dozen chapters formed in Colorado, including the Fonder Grange (founded in 1875) and its successor, Pikes Peak Grange No. 163 (established in Franktown in 1908). Both belonged to the statewide grange organization, which set up credit unions, insurance programs, and other services, and to the national grange association, which pursued long-range political goals. Local chapters more directly affected farmers' lives, with activities such as dances, holiday picnics, and town meetings. These sponsored events helped sparsely populated communities forge a sense of identity. Still active today, Pike's Peak Grange No. 163 in Franktown is listed on the National Register of Historic Places.

=== Castlewood Dam collapse ===
The Castlewood Dam was built in 1890, about five miles south of Franktown on Cherry Creek. The barrier stored enough water to irrigate 30,000 acres of farmland. The dam began leaking the year it was completed, and was serious enough that a hundred-foot section crumbled in 1897. Although its builders vouched for the structure's integrity, the dam continued to leak sporadically for decades. Finally, on August 3, 1933, Castlewood Dam collapsed, sending a billion-gallon torrent toward Denver. Only two people drowned, thanks to a switchboard operator's life-saving calls, but the flood devastated farms in this area and tore out six bridges in Denver, thirty miles downstream. The dam's remains can still be visited in nearby Castlewood Canyon State Park.

=== Timber industry ===
Frontier travelers often rejoiced upon reaching the timbered ridge just south of Franktown; it was the first woodland they encountered after hundreds of miles on the prairies. Early settlers in Colorado appreciated the forest, too-as a source of building material. Known as "the Pinery," it provided fast-growing Denver and other towns with most of their lumber during the 1860s. Several sawmills buzzed nonstop in and around Franktown, barely able to keep up with the demand. In the early 1870s, the Pinery supplied railroad ties to the Kansas Pacific and Denver & Rio Grande, both of which were laying tracks within twenty-five miles of here. Those routes eventually opened larger forests to exploitation and helped bring down this region's timber industry. By 1880, Franktown's sawmills had gone silent, but they had already left their mark: Pinery lumber built much of early Colorado.

== Geography ==
Colorado State Highways 83 and 86 intersect in the center of Franktown. SH 83 leads north 9 miles (14 km) to Parker and south 45 miles (72 km) to Colorado Springs, while SH 86 leads east 9 miles (14 km) to Elizabeth and west 7 miles (11 km) to Castle Rock, the Douglas County seat.

The Franktown CDP has an area of 1,893 acres (7.661 km^{2}), including 8.9 acres (0.036 km^{2}) of water.

== Demographics ==
The United States Census Bureau initially defined the Franktown CDP for the United States Census 2000.

Franktown CDP, Colorado
Year	Pop.	±%
2000	99	—
2010	395	+299.0%
2020	409	+3.5%
Source: United States Census Bureau

== Education ==
The Douglas County School District serves Franktown.

== See also ==
- Cherry Creek Rockshelter
- Franktown Cave, prehistorical archaeological site
