= Sulphur Gulch =

Physical characteristics
- Source
  - location: Parker, Colorado
  - elevation: 6,350 ft (1,940 m)
- Mouth
  - location: Confluence with Cherry Creek
  - coordinates: 39.51739°N 104.77782°W
  - elevation: 5,830 ft (1,780 m)
- Length: 6 mi (9.7 km)

Basin features
- Progression: Cherry Creek — South Platte — Platte — Missouri — Mississippi

The Sulphur Gulch is one of the tributaries of the Cherry Creek and is located in the U.S. states of Colorado. It is part of the Eastern Plains.

== Description ==
The Gulch is formed in Douglas County, Colorado, 20 miles (32 km) southeast of Denver, approximately 3 miles (4.8 km) east of Parker, and 5 miles (8.0 km) north of Hilltop.

The Gulch flows west through eastern Douglas County, and discharges into Cherry Creek in Bar CCC Park. The Gulch is dry during the summer unless there is heavy rain; it is full during spring after snow melt. The Gulch has flooded several times.

== Recreational Opportunities ==
There are trails along the Gulch.

== See also ==
- List of rivers of Colorado
