= Colorado State Highway 83 =

Highway in Colorado

State Highway 83
- S. Parker Road, Leetsdale Drive
- SH 83 highlighted in red

Route information
- Maintained by CDOT
- Length: 56.5 mi (90.9 km)

Major junctions
- South end: SH 21 in Colorado Springs
- E-470 in Parker; I-225 in Aurora
- North end: SH 2 in Denver

Location
- Country: United States
- State: Colorado
- Counties: El Paso, Douglas, Arapahoe, Denver

Highway system
- Colorado State Highway System; Interstate; US; State; Scenic
← SH 82	→ US 84

State Highway 83 (SH 83) is a state highway that is located along the Front Range in the U.S. State of Colorado. Spanning about 56.2 miles (90.4 km) from the SH 21 (Powers Boulevard) interchange in northern Colorado Springs and SH 2 (Colorado Boulevard.) in Denver, the highway follows a south–north route, paralleling Interstate 25 to the east and serving rural areas. Along with I-25, it is one of the only two routes in the Colorado State Highway System that directly connects Denver and Colorado Springs.

The section of SH 83 in Colorado Springs is signed as Interquest Parkway, which begins as a four-lane road. It drops down to two lanes as it exits the Colorado Springs area and is no longer signed as Interquest Pkwy. It remains as a two-lane, rural highway as it runs north out of El Paso County and into Douglas County. The road becomes signed as Parker Road as it enters Franktown and becomes a six-lane expressway heading into Parker and the Denver Metropolitan Area. It then becomes a four-lane road after interchanging Interstate 225 and becomes signed as Leetsdale Drive after crossing Quebec Street before ending at SH 2.

== Route description ==
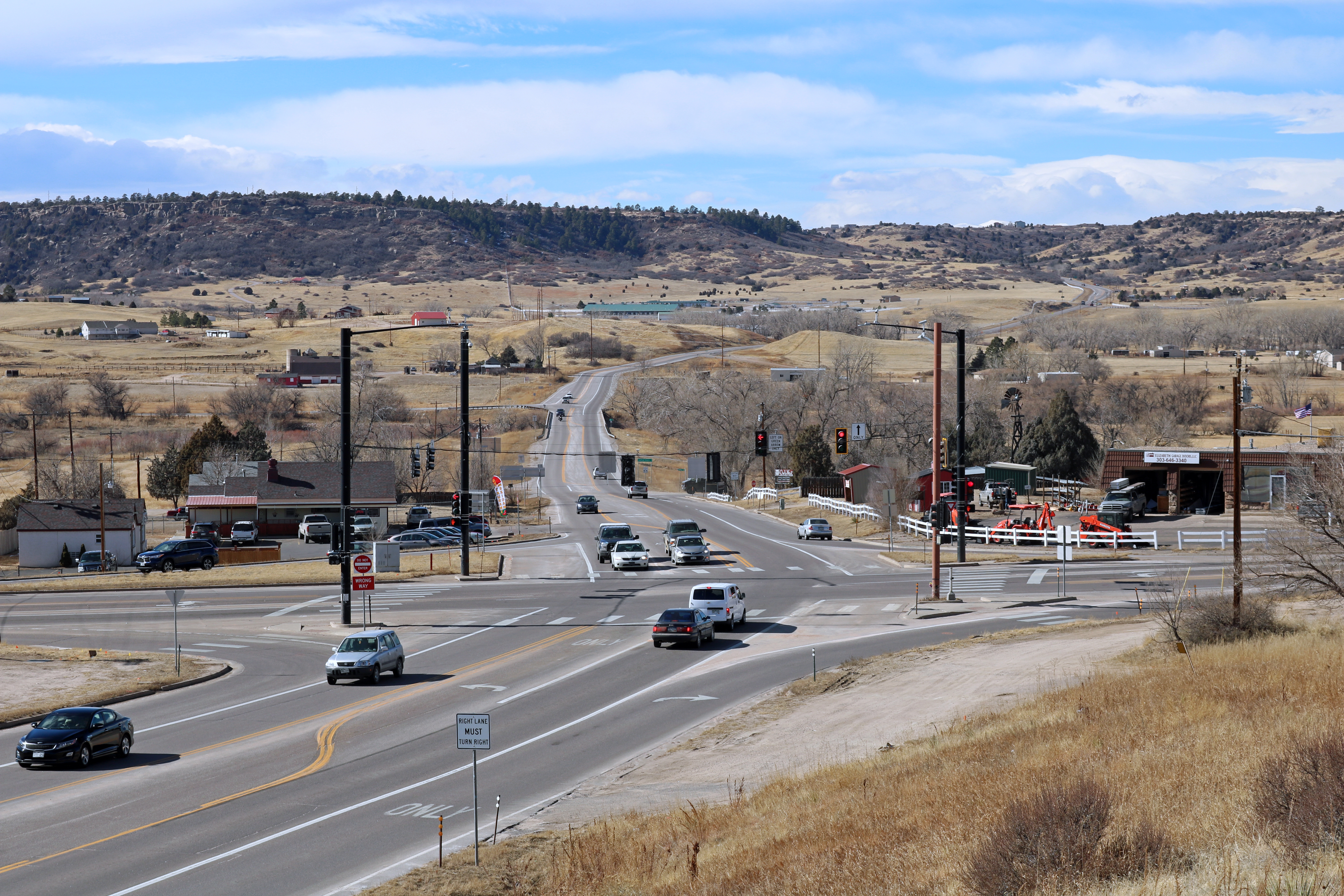
SH 86 (lower left corner to top) and SH 83 (left to right) in Franktown

SH 83 begins in far northeastern Colorado Springs, at the intersection of CO 21 and Interquest Parkway. From there it becomes a 60 mph rural highway, continuing northward through rural countryside for 30 miles to Franktown, through a tree heavy and hilly portion of Douglas County, and passing the eastern border of Castlewood Canyon State Park, then intersecting SH 86. The route becomes a six lane divided expressway at Bayou Gulch Road with a 55 mph speed limit. The route continues on and enters the City of Parker and the southeastern portion of the Denver Metropolitan Area, where it interchanges with E-470. After, it enters Arapahoe County just north of E-470 and descends into Centennial where it interchanges with Arapahoe Road, which has been upgraded to a grade-separated interchange. SH 83 continues as a 55 mph expressway as it enters Aurora, intersecting Hampden Avenue and Interstate 225. The route enters suburban Aurora, and it becomes more of a city street, dropping to a 45 mph speed limit and narrowing to 4 lanes. It soon enters the Cherry Creek district of Denver and ends at Colorado Boulevard/SH 2.

== History ==
The first 21 miles, originally extending from SH 115 to SH 21, was relinquished to and is now maintained by the city of Colorado Springs; with signage being inconsistent within the city limits. The highway began in southern Colorado Springs at the intersection of SH 115 and the terminus of SH 83 which is called South Academy Blvd. It ran east then north through the center of the city, where it turned into North Academy Blvd after the intersection with Pikes Peak Avenue, the north-south demarcation point for the city. Several city intersections were upgraded with overpasses (at Proby Parkway, US 24 and Woodmen Road) to avoid making this just another city street. The highway continued north then northwest through the city, and then just before connecting to I-25 it turned directly north and the speed limit increases to 55 mph. After paralleling I-25 for several miles, it turned east as it overlays Interquest Parkway to an interchange with SH 21.

== Future ==
In Parker, a section of Parker Road between E-470 and Lincoln Avenue is set to be widened as part of the Capital Improvement Project. It is currently six lanes from Lincoln to the Pine Lane intersection, where it opens up to eight lanes approaching the tollway. Construction will involve widening the six lane stretch between Pine and Lincoln to eight lanes. Existing turn lanes into future development at the Pine and Parker intersection and at Ponderosa Drive will be converted into through lanes and CDOT will add new turn lanes at those intersections. The new lanes will continue in and out of the slip lanes at Lincoln and continue as the existing through lanes north of Pine. Alongside with the expansion, a new sidewalk will be built that will connect the existing Baldwin Gulch Trail at the Ponderosa intersection to the existing sidewalk between Pine and Crown Crest Boulevard that will also be expanded. Construction has not yet started and is scheduled to be completed in the spring of 2023.

== Major intersections ==
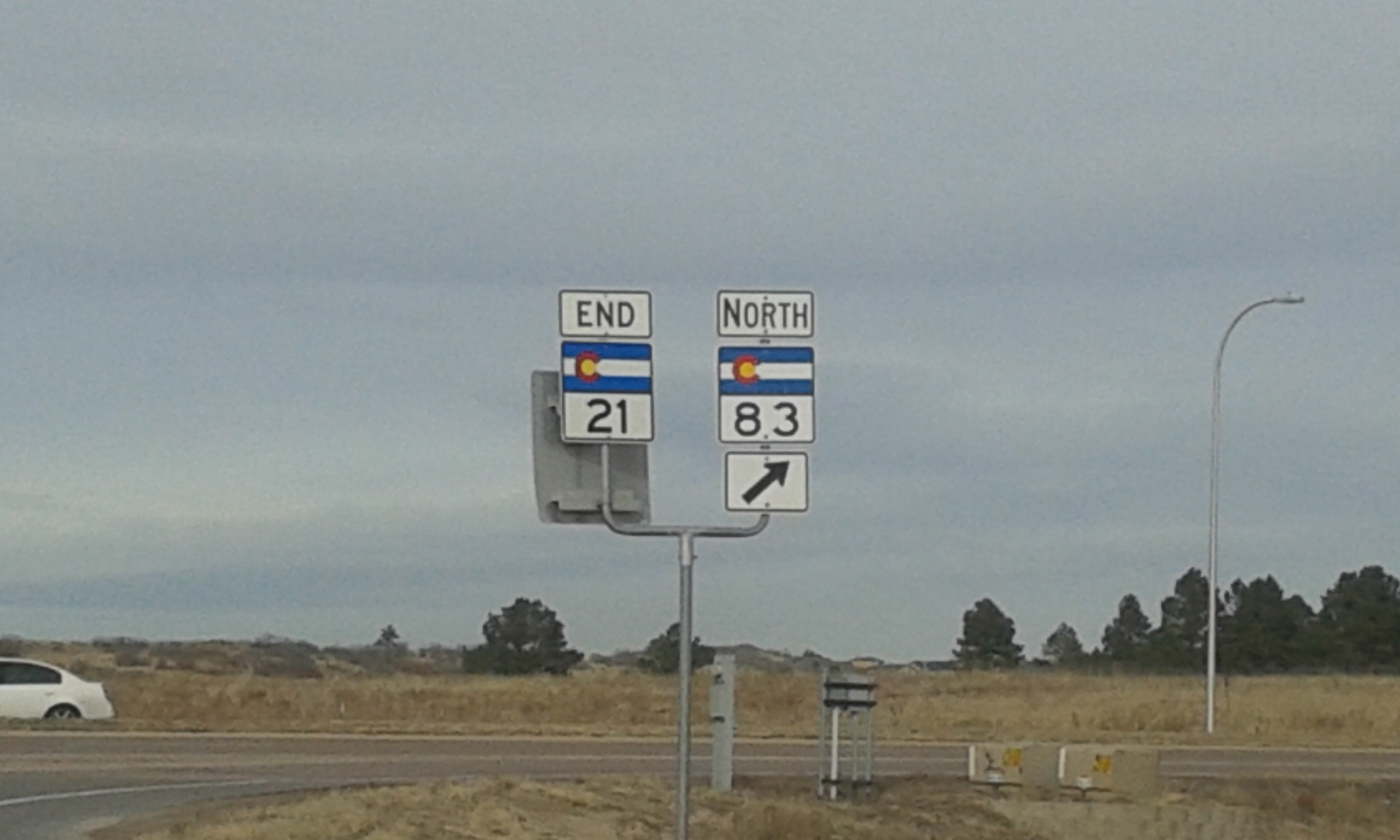
Southern terminus of SH 83 at Powers Boulevard (SH 21) in Colorado Springs

All exits are unnumbered.

County	Location	mi (Note: Mileposts never purged after section from Interquest to SH 115 was turned back in 2007)	km	Destinations	Notes
El Paso	Colorado Springs	20.368	32.779	SH 21 south (Powers Boulevard)	Southern terminus; road continues south as Interquest Parkway; current northern terminus of SH 21; future interchange
El Paso		28.132	45.274	CR 105 west	Western terminus of former State Highway 105 and current El Paso CR 105. CR 105 continues west from SH 83 untll intersecting SH 105 at Jackson Creek Parkway in Monument
Douglas		30.237	48.662	CR 404 (East Palmer Divide Avenue)	
Douglas	Franktown	50.754	81.681	SH 86 – Castle Rock, Elizabeth	
Douglas	Parker	62.000	99.779	E-470 to I-25 / I-70 – Limon, Denver International Airport, Colorado Springs	South end of expressway; E-470 exit 5
Arapahoe	Aurora–Centennial– Foxfield tripoint	65.000	104.607	SH 88 west / CR 42 east (East Arapahoe Road)	Grade-separated Interchange; Eastern terminus of SH-88. Eastbound Arapahoe Road accessed from northbound SH-83 via S. Lewiston Way
Arapahoe	Aurora	69.560	111.946	Hampden Avenue east	Grade-separated Interchange
Arapahoe	Aurora	70.000	112.654	Vaughn Way / Dam Road	Grade-separated Interchange
Arapahoe	Aurora	70.200	112.976	I-225 – Greenwood Village, Aurora	North end of expressway; I-225 exit 4; Northbound flyover ramp to Southbound I-225;
Arapahoe–Denver county line	Aurora–Denver line	72.130	116.082	SH 30 (Havana Street)	
City and County of Denver		77.267	124.349	SH 2 (Colorado Boulevard)	Northern terminus
1.000 mi = 1.609 km; 1.000 km = 0.621 mi: Electronic toll collection; Route transition
