= Worker Studio =

American animation studio

- New logo since 2013
- Industry: CGI animation Motion pictures
- Founded: 2009
- Founder: Michael "Ffish" Hemschoot
- Headquarters: Centennial, Colorado, USA
- Key people: Michael Hemschoot, Founder; Jason Cangialosi, Partner; Barry Kooser, Former Partner
- Products: animated films
- Website: worker-studio.com

Worker Studio is an American animation and visual effects company based in Centennial, Colorado, founded in 2009 by Michael "Ffish" Hemschoot. The company has provided visual effects for a number of short films including Angela Bettis' segment E is for Exterminate in the horror anthology film The ABCs of Death. In 2013, the studio began developing an animated adaptation of Phil Hartman's comedy album, Phil Hartman's Flat TV, which was posthumously released in 2002 after he performed and recorded it in 1978. The studio is also the production company behind the animated documentary John Ross: American, based on the life of World War II pilot John H. Ross.

Former Disney Artist Barry Kooser joined the studio as a partner and Chief Creative Officer until 2015. Hemschoot and Kooser met while teaching animation at Rocky Mountain College of Art and Design.

In 2017, the studio released an original animated, stop motion short film, titled Camping a la Bergman, a parody inspired to be an homage to Swedish filmmaker Ingmar Bergman, by utilizing black and white cinematography, somber classical music and existential Swedish dialogue. The short appeared at a number of film festivals, including Etiuda&Anima International Film Festival and StopTrik International Film Festival. It was broadcast on Colorado Public Television and streaming on e360TV, a VOD platform.
