= National Register of Historic Places listings in Douglas County, Colorado =

Location of Douglas County in Colorado

This is a list of the National Register of Historic Places listings in Douglas County, Colorado.

This is intended to be a complete list of the properties and districts on the National Register of Historic Places in Douglas County, Colorado, United States. The locations of National Register properties and districts for which the latitude and longitude coordinates are included below, may be seen in a map.

There are 29 properties and districts listed on the National Register in the county. Another property was once listed but has been removed.

This National Park Service list is complete through NPS recent listings posted November 13, 2025.

== Current listings ==
	Name on the Register	Image	Date listed	Location	City or town	Description
1	American Federation of Human Rights Headquarters	American Federation of Human Rights Headquarters	March 19, 1998 (#98000247)	9070 S. Douglas Boulevard; 39°13′45″N 104°53′14″W	Larkspur	Headquarters in the United States of co-Masonry, built in 1924.
2	Bayou Gulch		April 13, 2020 (#100005167)	Address Restricted	Franktown vicinity	
3	Bear Canon Agricultural District	Bear Canon Agricultural District	October 29, 1975 (#75000517)	South of Denver on both sides of State Highway 105 from State Highway 67 south to Jarre Creek; 39°23′46″N 104°57′41″W	Sedalia	
4	Castle Rock Depot	Castle Rock Depot	October 11, 1974 (#74000575)	420 Elbert St. 39°22′27″N 104°51′44″W	Castle Rock	Railroad depot built in 1875, since moved and now the Castle Rock Museum
5	Castle Rock Elementary School	Castle Rock Elementary School	September 20, 1984 (#84000827)	3rd and Cantril Sts. 39°22′22″N 104°51′19″W	Castle Rock	
6	Cherokee Ranch	Cherokee Ranch	October 21, 1994 (#94001228)	North of County Road 85 and south of Daniels Park Rd. 39°27′20″N 104°55′36″W	Sedalia	3,280 acres (13.3 km^{2}) ranch including a replica of a 15th century Scottish castle
7	Cherry Creek Bridge	Cherry Creek Bridge	October 15, 2002 (#02001147)	State Highway 83 at milepost 46.30; 39°19′52″N 104°44′02″W	Franktown	
8	Church of St. Philip-in-the-Field and Bear Canon Cemetery	Church of St. Philip-in-the-Field and Bear Canon Cemetery	April 11, 1973 (#73000471)	5 miles (8.0 km) south of Sedalia on State Highway 105; 39°22′05″N 104°57′33″W	Sedalia	
9	Daniels Park	Daniels Park	June 30, 1995 (#95000795)	Along Douglas County Road 67 northeast of Sedalia; 39°28′50″N 104°55′37″W	Sedalia	
10	Devils Head Lookout	Devils Head Lookout	June 13, 2003 (#03000518)	South Platte District in the Pike National Forest; 39°15′37″N 105°06′03″W	Sedalia	
11	Samuel Dyer House	Samuel Dyer House	December 13, 2016 (#16000836)	208 North Cantril St. 39°22′18″N 104°51′22″W	Castle Rock	
12	Evans Homestead Rural Historic Landscape		April 25, 2012 (#12000226)	Address Restricted	Franktown	
13	First National Bank of Douglas County	First National Bank of Douglas County	April 14, 1995 (#95000440)	300 Wilcox St. 39°22′21″N 104°51′35″W	Castle Rock	Bank building constructed in 1904; designed by George Louis Bettcher.
14	Franktown Cave		February 1, 2006 (#05001561)	Address Restricted	Franktown	
15	Glen Grove School	Glen Grove School	November 5, 1974 (#74000576)	North of Palmer Lake off Perry Park Rd. 39°15′38″N 104°57′02″W	Palmer Lake	Re-purposed as a barn.
16	Benjamin Hammar House	Benjamin Hammar House	February 3, 1993 (#92001847)	203 Cantril St. 39°22′18″N 104°51′22″W	Castle Rock	
17	Indian Park School	Indian Park School	February 8, 1978 (#78000857)	10 miles (16 km) west of Sedalia on State Highway 67; 39°22′49″N 105°04′52″W	Sedalia	
18	Keystone Hotel	Keystone Hotel	June 20, 1997 (#97000594)	219 and 223 4th St. 39°22′25″N 104°51′36″W	Castle Rock	
19	John Kinner House	John Kinner House	October 11, 1974 (#74000578)	6694 Perry Park Rd. 39°16′19″N 104°57′27″W	Sedalia	House built in 1896 of sandstone quarried by John Kinner.
20	Lamb Spring	Lamb Spring	March 13, 1997 (#97000208)	Address Restricted	Littleton	
21	Louviers Village	Louviers Village	July 2, 1999 (#99000710)	Louviers Boulevard, Hillcrest Dr., Triangle Dr., Main St., Valley View St., and 1st, 2nd, 3rd and 4th Sts. 39°28′36″N 105°00′22″W	Louviers	
22	Louviers Village Club	Louviers Village Club	September 22, 1995 (#95001117)	Junction of Louviers Boulevard and 1st St. 39°28′34″N 105°00′23″W	Louviers	
23	Pike's Peak Grange No. 163	Pike's Peak Grange No. 163	October 1, 1990 (#90001502)	3093 State Highway 83; 39°24′32″N 104°45′42″W	Franktown	
24	Ben Quick Ranch and Fort	Ben Quick Ranch and Fort	October 1, 1974 (#74000577)	6695 W. Plum Creek Rd. 39°15′52″N 104°57′10″W	Palmer Lake	
25	Roxborough State Park Archaeological District	Roxborough State Park Archaeological District	January 27, 1983 (#83001316)	Address Restricted	Waterton	
26	Ruth Memorial Methodist Episcopal Church	Ruth Memorial Methodist Episcopal Church	May 1, 1989 (#89000332)	19670 E. Mainstreet; 39°31′05″N 104°45′34″W	Parker	
27	Santa Fe Railway Water Tank	Santa Fe Railway Water Tank	April 18, 2003 (#03000237)	About 200 yards (180 m) west of intersection of U.S. Route 85 with State Highway 67; 39°26′22″N 104°57′52″W	Sedalia	Railway water tank used 1906 to 1950.
28	Reginald Sinclaire House	Reginald Sinclaire House	September 20, 1991 (#91001418)	6154 Perry Park Rd. 39°16′20″N 104°56′39″W	Larkspur	Home of Reginald Sinclaire, in Colorado Aviation Hall of Fame
29	Spring Valley School	Spring Valley School	December 18, 1978 (#78000856)	East of Larkspur at Spring Valley and Lorraine Rds. 39°09′08″N 104°46′10″W	Larkspur	

== Former listing ==
	Name on the Register	Image	Date listed	Date removed	Location	City or town	Description
1	Douglas County Courthouse		December 12, 1976 (#76000558)	August 24, 1978	301 Wilcox St.	Castle Rock	Destroyed by fire March 11, 1978.

== See also ==
- List of National Historic Landmarks in Colorado
- List of National Register of Historic Places in Colorado
- Bibliography of Colorado
- Geography of Colorado
- History of Colorado
- Index of Colorado-related articles
- List of Colorado-related lists
- Outline of Colorado
