= Bettcher =

Bettcher may refer to:

== People ==
- George Louis Bettcher (1862–1952), American architect based in Colorado
- James Bettcher (born 1978), American football coach
- Louis Bettcher (1914–1999), American inventor and manufacturer of handheld powered circular knives
- Talia Mae Bettcher (born 1966), philosopher

== Other ==
- Bettcher Industries, developer and manufacturer of cutting tools used in food processing operations and industrial applications
