= Senator du Pont =

Senator du Pont may refer to:

- Charles I. du Pont (1797–1869), Delaware State Senator
- Henry A. du Pont (1838–1926), U.S. Senator from Delaware from 1906 to 1917
- T. Coleman du Pont (1863–1930), U.S. Senator from Delaware from 1925 to 1928
- Victor Marie du Pont (1767–1827), Delaware State Senator
