= Spring Valley School =

Spring Valley School may refer to:

In India

In the United States

- Spring Valley School District 120 Building, Spring Valley, Arkansas
- Spring Valley School (Larkspur, Colorado)
- Spring Valley School (Polk County, Oregon), listed on the National Register of Historic Places

== See also ==
- Spring Valley High School (disambiguation)
- Spring Valley (disambiguation)
