= Louviers Village Club =

- U.S. National Register of Historic Places
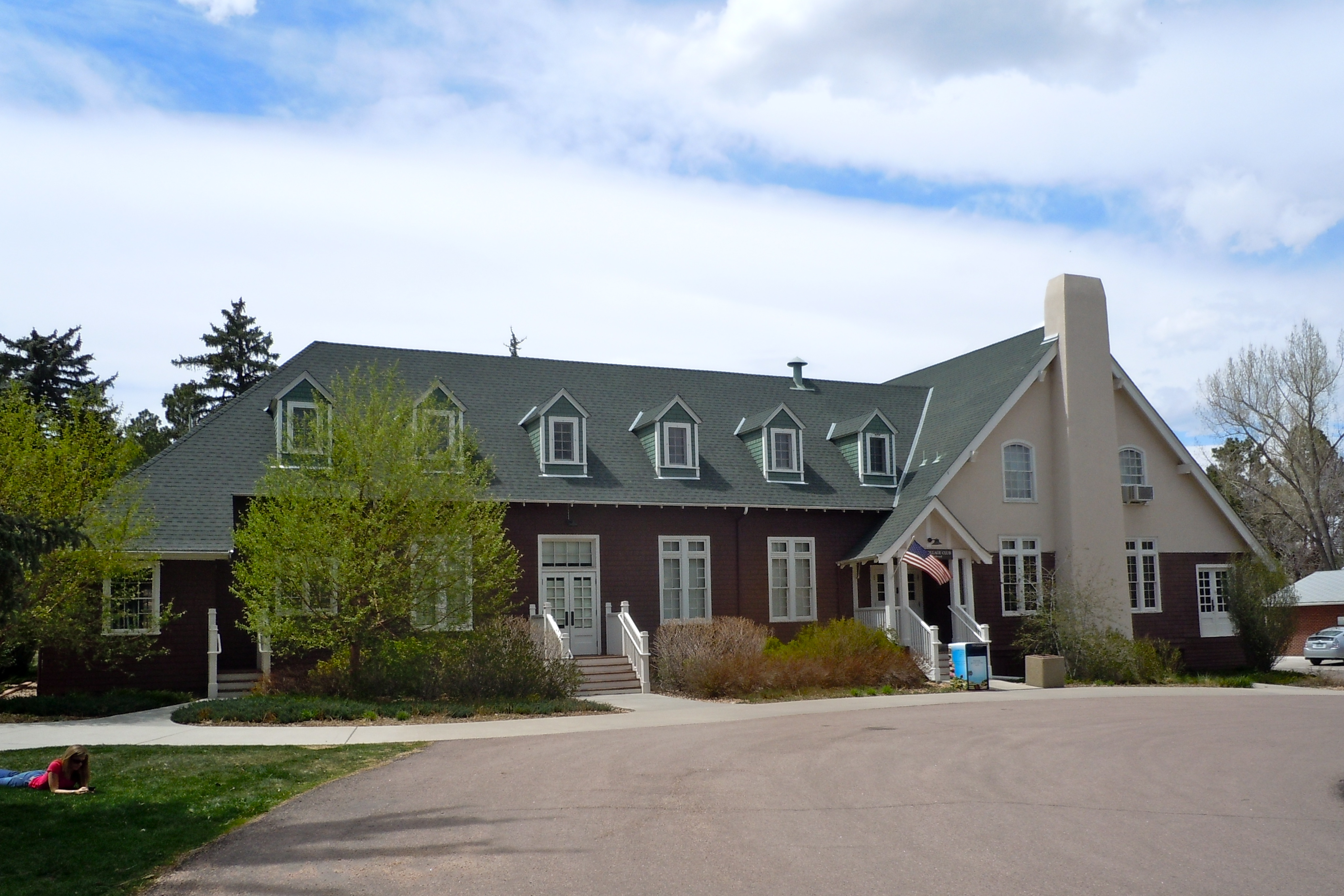
- Club building in 2011

- Location within Colorado
- Location: Jct. of Louviers Blvd. and First St., Louviers, Colorado
- Coordinates: 39°28′34″N 105°00′23″W
- Area: less than one acre
- Built: 1917
- Architectural style: Bungalow/Craftsman
- NRHP reference No.: 95001117
- Added to NRHP: September 22, 1995

The Louviers Village Club, in Louviers, Colorado, was built in 1917. It was listed on the National Register of Historic Places in 1995.

It was built by DuPont to serve as a community building in the company town of Louviers. It is a U-shaped building, built in Craftsman style.

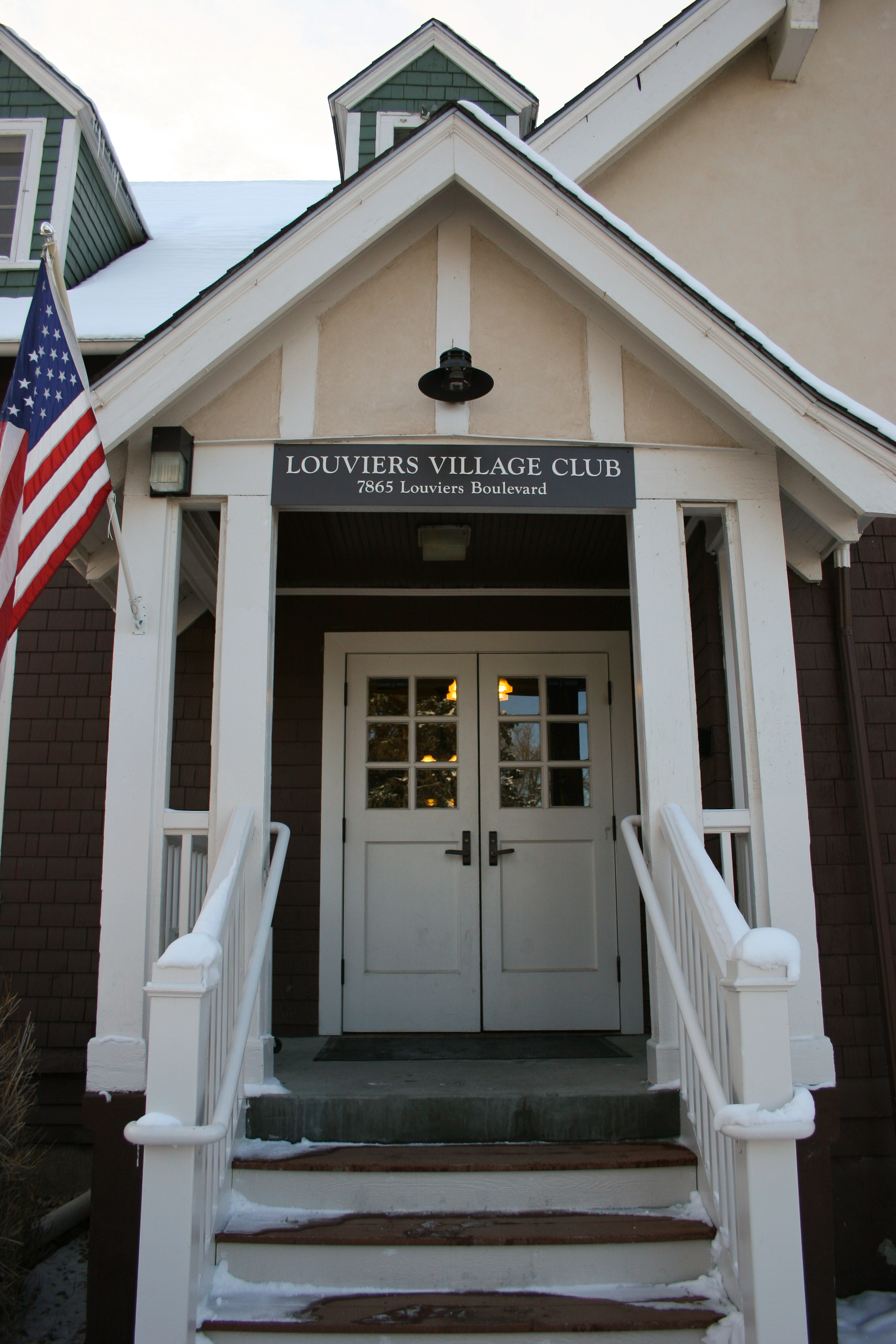
Club doorway in 2011

It was deemed significant for NRHP listing "for its association with the explosive industry's contribution to the development of the West, social history as illustrated by the company town movement, and for the information it provides regarding entertainment and recreation in the early Twentieth Century. During the Nineteenth and early Twentieth Centuries, E. I. du Pont de Nemours and Company pioneered the development and manufacture of explosives in the United States. Business was brisk for the Du Pont Powder Company by the early Twentieth Century, when dynamite products were in great demand for use in mining and in railroad, tunnel and road construction. Du Pont, the nation's leading supplier of explosives at the time, was unable to fill all of the orders for its products. In order to expand its production capabilities, Du Pont sought new sites for the establishment of explosives plants. The company was particularly desirous of locating a plant in the Rocky Mountain region due to the fact that there were then no sources for explosives closer than the West Coast or the Mississippi River. In 1906, Du Pont procured a site on Plum Creek adjacent to the Denver and Rio Grande Railroad line. First called "Toluca" after a station on the line, the name was quickly changed to "Louviers" after the ancestral home in France of the DuvPont family. Dynamite production at Louviers began in 1908, with over a half million pounds produced the first year. By 1951, "Louviers Works", as the plant was called, produced over two million pounds of dynamite per month and employed 230 workers. In 1971, after the production of an estimated one billion pounds of dynamite, the company shifted emphasis to production of PETN and a new emulsion explosive product. Operations at the plant ceased in the early 1980s. The plant facilities were extensively modified over time in keeping with technological advances, and are still maintained by Du Pont on a care taking basis. Du Pont retains ownership of the majority of land immediately surrounding the town of Louviers."

== See also ==
- National Register of Historic Places listings in Douglas County, Colorado
