= Santa Fe Railway Water Tank =

- U.S. National Register of Historic Places
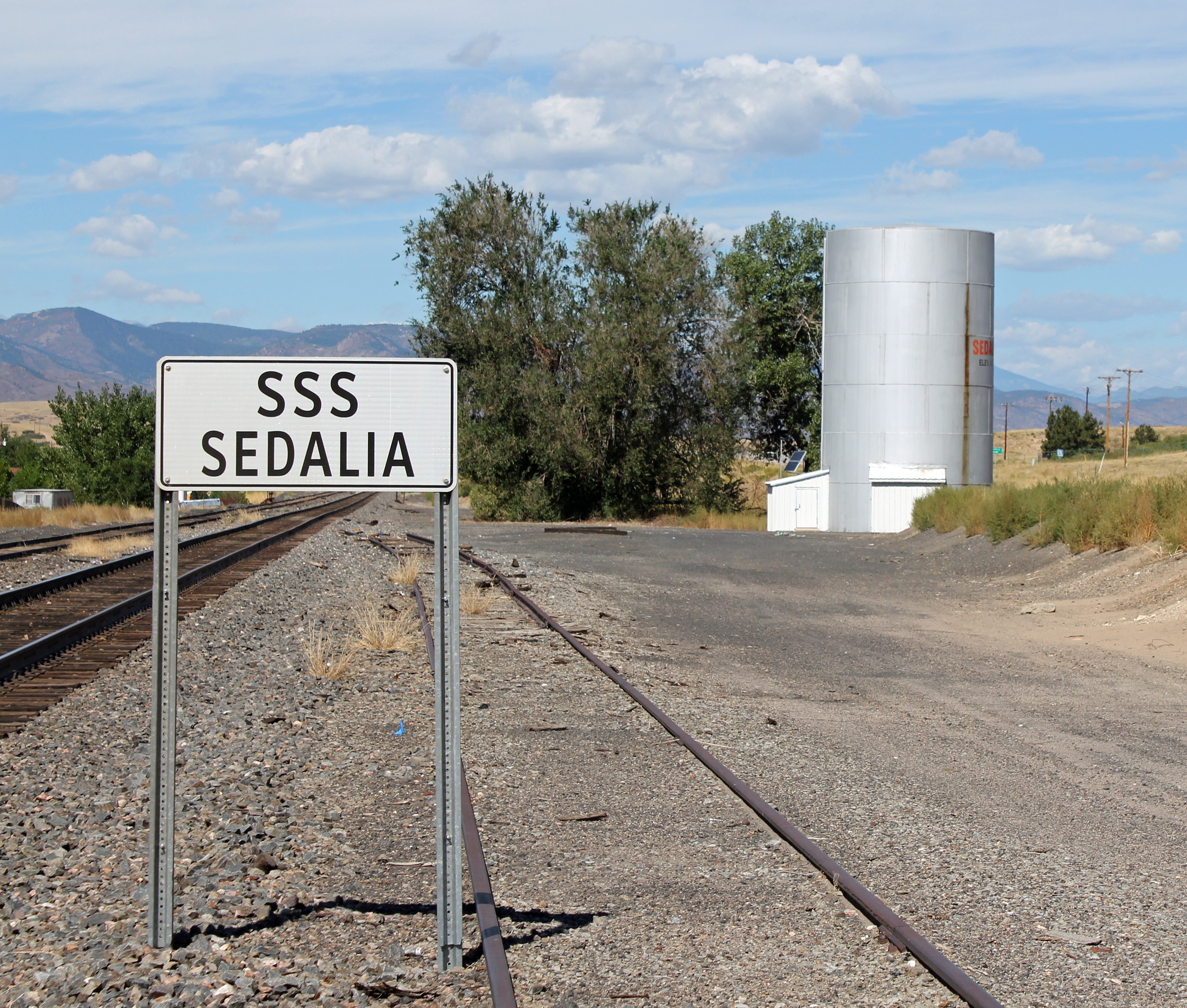
- Tank in 2012

- Location within Colorado
- Location: Near intersection of US 85 with CO 67, Sedalia, Colorado
- Coordinates: 39.43939°N 104.96440°W
- Area: less than one acre
- Built by: Denver & Santa Fe Railway Company
- Architectural style: Railroad water tank
- MPS: Railroads in Colorado, 1858-1948 MPS
- NRHP reference No.: 03000237
- Added to NRHP: April 18, 2003

The Santa Fe Railway Water Tank, or Sedalia Water Tank, on the railway through Sedalia, Colorado in Douglas County, Colorado, is a historic object listed on the National Register of Historic Places.

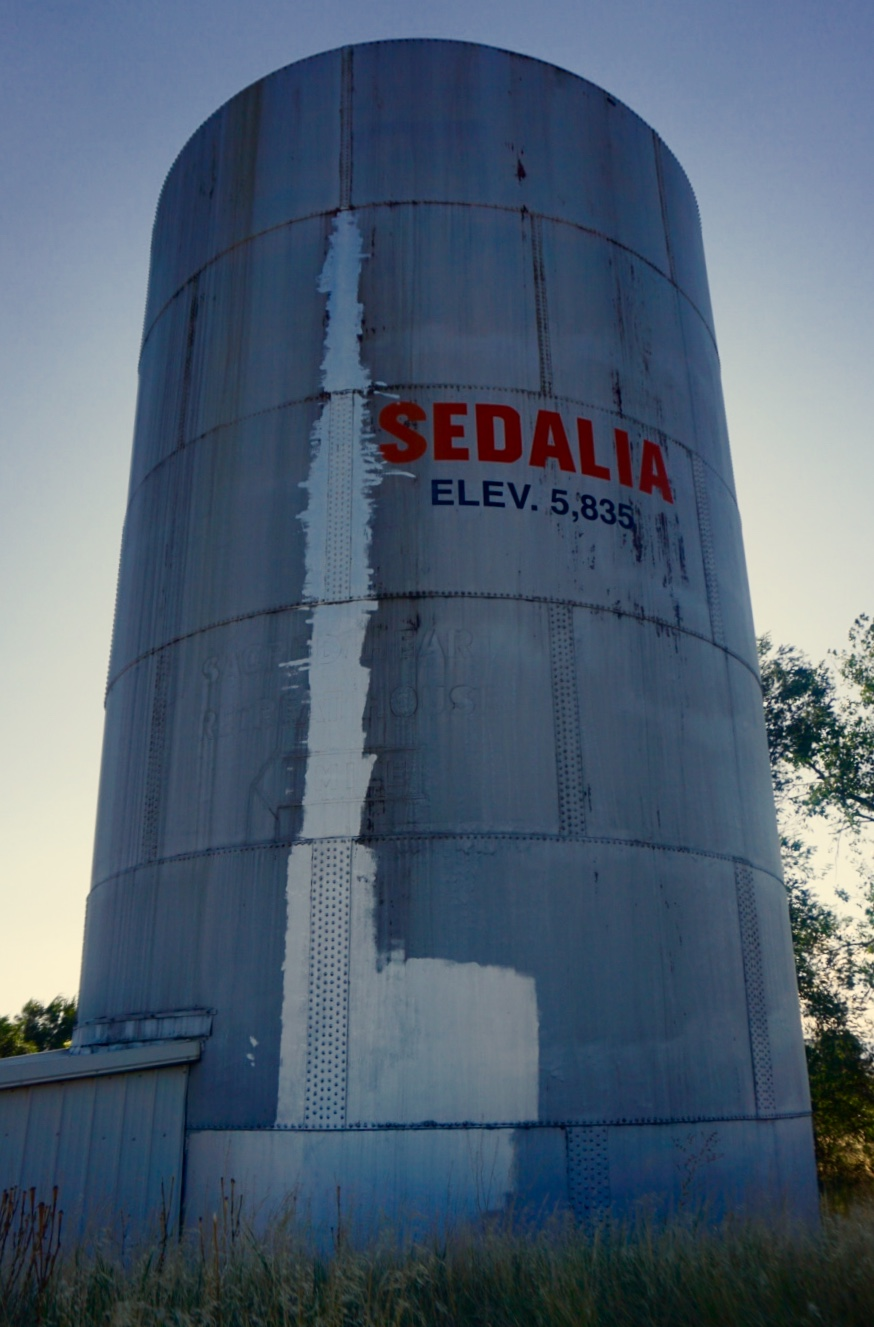
Tank in 2019

It is a cylindrical water tank 24 feet (7.3 m) in diameter, 43 feet (13 m) tall, with capacity of 140,000 US gallons (530 m^{3}), upon a slag foundation, built in 1906. Per its NRHP nomination, it was installed by the Denver and Santa Fe Railway Company, a subsidiary of the Atchison, Topeka and Santa Fe Railway (AT&SF), an early railroad which built track through the area in 1887. It provided water for coal-powered steam locomotives from 1906 until 1950 when its "stand pipe" was removed, after water was no longer needed (when diesel locomotives had replaced steam ones).

It was described in its NRHP nomination as follows:

The cylindrical tank is constructed of large sections of steel that have been riveted together. Historically the tank was painted in Santa Fe colors (Santa Fe Red with the Santa Fe logo in yellow, black and red). Currently it is painted metallic silver. Painted high on the north side of the tank (facing Highway 85) is "SEDALIA" in red with a black outline and a smaller "ELEV. 5835." in black. There is a metal access ladder and a painted gauge on the southwest side of the tank. Two small sheds, measuring 8'5" x 9'8" and 7'11" x 7'3", extend from the south and east sides of the tank. These two pump houses have corrugated metal shed roofs with corrugated metal siding.Alterations to the structure have been minor. In 1950 with the decline in steam powered locomotives, the stand pipe was removed. The two small, metal additions were constructed in 1969 to prevent the water line from freezing. The tank originally was open (i.e., without a cover or lid). Sometime in the early 1950s, a flat cap was installed. Stories were told of kids swimming in the tank, having accessed the "swimming pool" via a ladder on the inside of the tank. The tank was last painted around 1972.The setting has been impacted with the loss of the associated railroad buildings. Originally the water tank shared the site with a depot and other smaller related railroad buildings that have since been moved or demolished. The berm was constructed to keep runoff from the highway away from the water tank, although it is not known when this was done. Despite these alterations, the water tank still conveys its original function through its characteristic shape, materials, and location within the railroad right of way.

It was deemed significant "for its association with the operation of the Atchison, Topeka and Santa Fe Railway (AT&SF), an early railroad that constructed its track through the area in 1887. The tank provided water for the coal-fired steam locomotives that ran the line. At the end of WW II, diesel engines began replacing steam locomotives, and the need for large water tanks at frequent intervals along the rails diminished. Most steam locomotives were retired by the 1950s. It was later deeded to the Sedalia Water and Sanitation District for the community’s water supply. The period of significance began with the construction of the tank in 1906 and ended in 1950 when the stand pipe was removed. The steel tank also meets the registration requirements under criterion C for it represents a distinctive design and construction method. In the 19th and early 20th centuries, water stations usually consisted of elevated wooden water tanks. Steel tanks began to replace wood on some railroads after the turn of the century. The steel tank at Sedalia is an early example of the evolving technology, and it is believed to be one of the last surviving steel water tanks in the state."

It is located within the railway right-of-way, about 200 yards (180 m) west of the intersection of U.S. Route 85 with State Highway 67 U.S. Route 85. It is closer to U.S. 85 and directly visible from that highway. It is also visible from Colorado State Highway 67, at least from its crossing of the rail tracks.

== See also ==
- Sedalia Historic Fire House Museum
- National Register of Historic Places listings in Douglas County, Colorado
