= SVHS =

SVHS most often refers to:

- S-VHS—Super VHS video cassette system

It can also be used to refer to the following preparatory schools:

- Springvale House in Mashonaland East, Zimbabwe

It can also be used as an abbreviation for the following high schools:

- Scotts Valley High School in Scotts Valley, California
- Seneca Valley High School in Germantown, Maryland
- Shades Valley High School in Irondale, Alabama
- Shelby Valley High School in Pike County, Kentucky
- Shepaug Valley High School in Washington, Connecticut
- Simi Valley High School in Simi Valley, California
- Smithson Valley High School in Spring Branch, Texas
- Spring Valley High School (disambiguation), one of several schools with the same name.
- Star Valley High School in Afton, Wyoming
- St. Vincent de Paul High School in Petaluma, California
- Sky View High School in Smithfield, Utah
- Smoky Valley High School in Lindsborg, Kansas
- Sonoma Valley High School in Sonoma, California
- South View High School in Hope Mills, North Carolina
- Symmes Valley High School in Willow Wood, Ohio
- Saint Viator High School in Arlington Heights, Illinois
- Susquehanna Valley High School in Conklin, New York
