= Altamaha Apartments =

- U.S. National Register of Historic Places
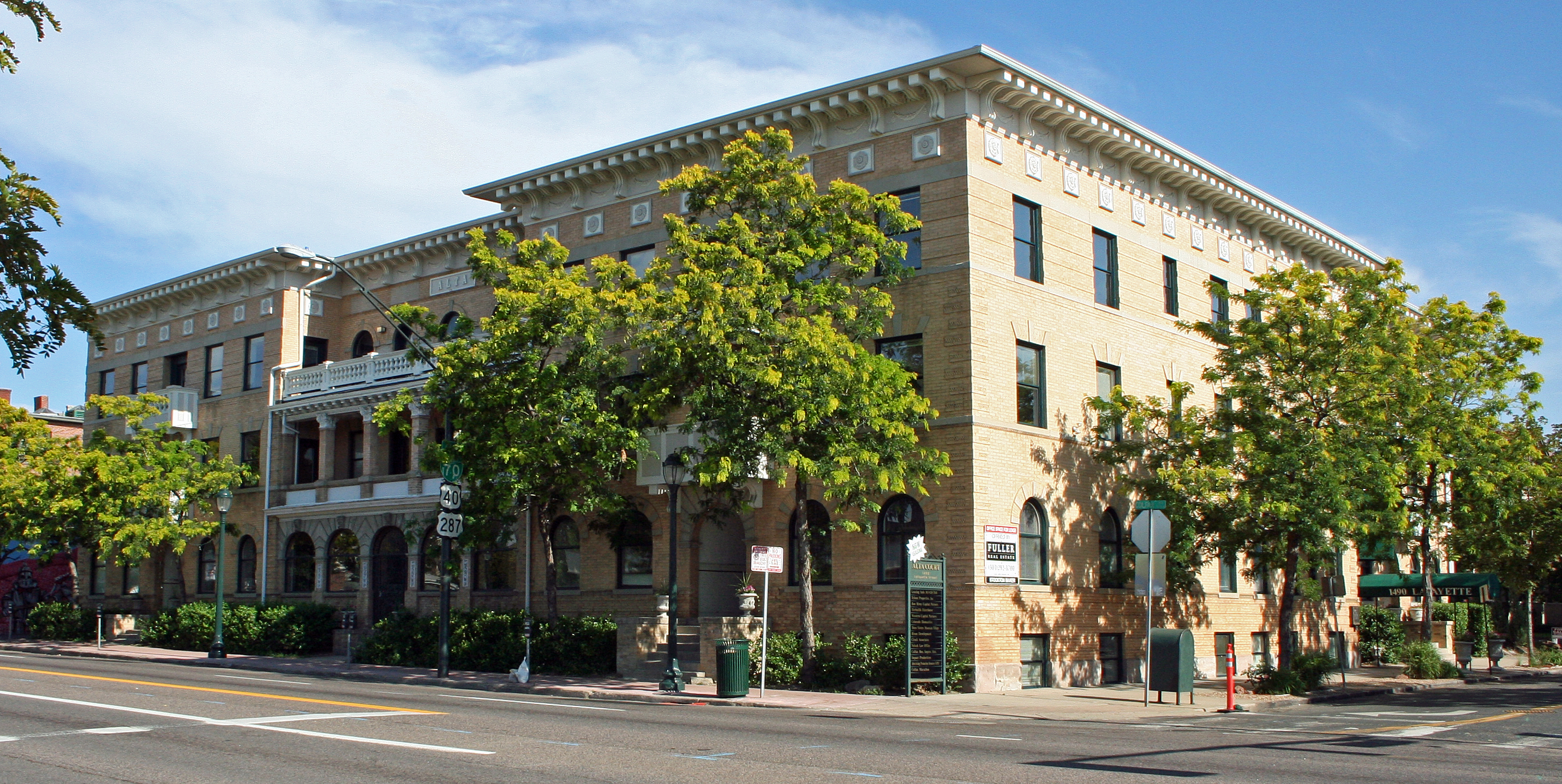
- Building in 2009

- Location within Colorado
- Location: 1490 Lafayette St., Denver, Colorado
- Coordinates: 39.73971°N 104.97054°W
- Area: less than one acre
- Built: 1902
- Architect: George L. Bettcher
- Architectural style: Italian Renaissance Revival
- NRHP reference No.: 04000382
- Added to NRHP: May 5, 2004

The Altamaha Apartments, at 1490 Lafayette St. in the Cheesman Park neighborhood of Denver, Colorado, was built in 1902. It was listed on the National Register of Historic Places in 2004. It was designed by architect George L. Bettcher in Italian Renaissance Revival style.

It was deemed significant as representing "Denver's early twentieth century adoption of a new form of residential housing-the luxury apartment building. The Altamaha Apartments are also significant under Criterion C, as they embody the distinctive characteristics of the Italian Renaissance Revival style as applied to an apartment building.

It has also been known as Alta Court, and in 2020 a sign indicates Alta Court Offices.

The listing includes two contributing buildings.
