= Charles I. du Pont =

American politician (1797–1869)

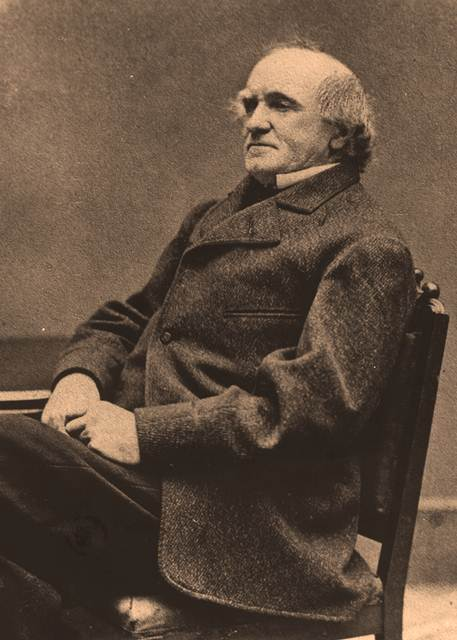

Member of the Delaware Senate from the New Castle County district
- In office January 4, 1853 – January 6, 1857
- In office January 5, 1841 – January 7, 1845

Personal details
- Born: Charles Irénée du Pont; March 29, 1797 Charleston, South Carolina
- Died: January 31, 1869 (aged 71) Louviers, Delaware
- Resting place: Du Pont de Nemours Cemetery
- Spouses: Dorcas Van Dyke; Anne Ridgely
- Children: with Dorcas: Victor; Mary Van Dyke; Charles Jr.; with Anne: Amélia; Henry
- Parents: Victor Marie du Pont; Gabrielle Josephine de la Fite
- Relatives: E. I. du Pont (uncle); Pierre du Pont de Nemours (grandfather)
- Occupation: Manufacturer, politician

Charles Irénée du Pont (March 29, 1797 – January 31, 1869) was an American manufacturer and politician, and an early member of the prominent du Pont family business. He was a nephew of Éleuthère Irénée du Pont, the founder of the E. I. du Pont de Nemours and Company, and a member of the Delaware Senate.

== Early life ==
Du Pont was born March 29, 1797, in Charleston, South Carolina, the eldest son of French immigrants Victor Marie du Pont de Nemours (born 1767 in Paris) and Gabrielle Joséphine de la Fite de Pelleport (born 1770 in Stenay). He lived with his parents in New York City until they established themselves in the wool-manufacturing business across from the Brandywine Creek from the Eleutherian Mills near Greenville, Delaware.

He was educated at Mount Airy College in Germantown, Philadelphia, from 1809 to 1813, when he left school to work with his father in Delaware.

== Professional career ==
In 1815, the textile manufacturing company of Du Pont, Bauduy & Co. ended acrimoniously. Pierre de Bauduy de Bellevue, a Frenchman who had invested in the business in 1803, eventually sued the du Ponts over various disagreements. (The lawsuit was decided in the du Pont's favor in 1924.)

After de Bauduy's departure, Charles and his father formed the partnership of Victor & Charles I. du Pont de Nemours & Co. After Victor's death in 1827, the firm continued to operate as Charles I. du Pont & Co., with the U.S. Army as a major client for its cloth. Charlies retired in 1856, at which point E. I. duPont de Nemours & Co. purchased his company.

== Civic and political career ==
In addition to his business interest, du Pont was very active in civic and political affairs. Du Pont was a member of the Whig Party, who served in the State Senate from New Castle County for four terms in the Delaware General Assembly from 1841 to 1847.

He was elected a director of the Farmers' Bank of Delaware in 1830, and served as president of the bank from 1865 to 1868. In 1853, he was made director of the Delaware Railroad Company, and was also a director of the Philadelphia, Wilmington & Baltimore Railroad Company and the Columbia Insurance Co. of Philadelphia. He was also of the Brandywine Manufacturers' Sunday School and vice president of the Delaware Improvement Association.

== Family ==
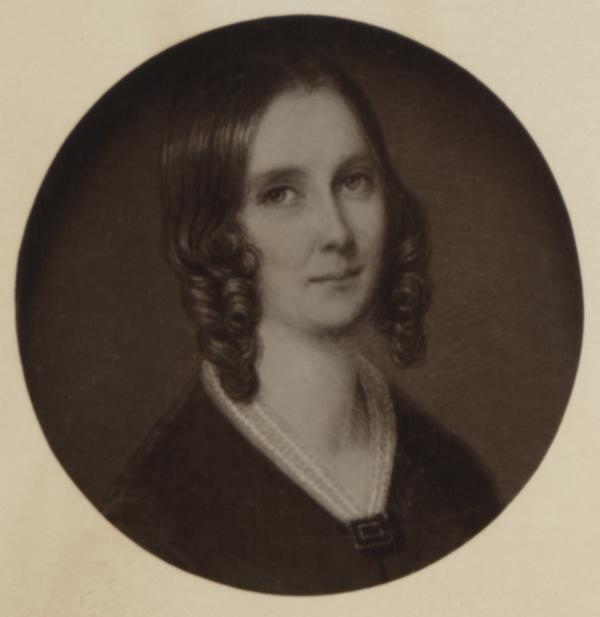
Anne (Ridgeley) du Pont

In 1824, du Pont married Dorcas Montgomery Van Dyke (born 1806), daughter of U.S. Senator and Representative Nicholas Van Dyke III and granddaughter of Delaware Governor Nicholas Van Dyke Jr. Their wedding was attended by the Marquis de Lafayette. They had three children: Victor, Mary Van Dyke and Charles Jr.

After Dorcas' death in 1838, he married Ann Ridgely (born 1815). Like his first wife, Ridgely was the daughter of a U.S. Senator and Representative from Delaware, Henry M. Ridgely. They had two children: Amélia Elizabeth (who married her cousin Eugene du Pont) and Henry Ridgely.

Du Pont died January 31, 1869, at Louviers, his family estate, and is buried at the Du Pont de Nemours Cemetery at Winterthur, near Greenville.
