= John Kinner House =

- U.S. National Register of Historic Places
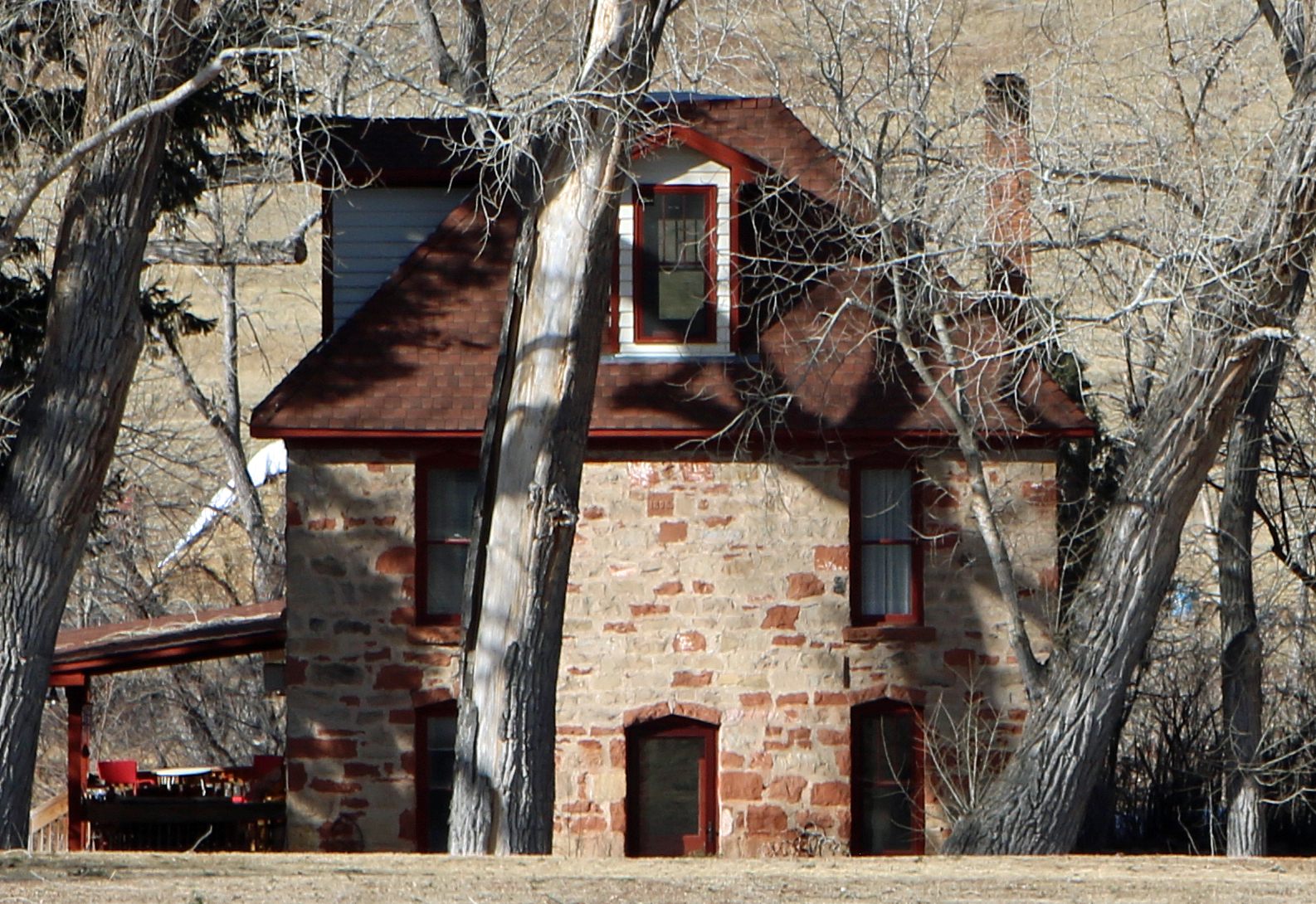

- Location within Colorado
- Nearest city: Sedalia, Colorado
- Coordinates: 39.271846°N 104.957591°W
- Area: 4 acres (1.6 ha)
- Built: 1896
- Built by: Kinner, John, et al.
- NRHP reference No.: 74000578
- Added to NRHP: October 11, 1974

The John Kinner House, in Douglas County, Colorado near Sedalia, Colorado, was built in 1896. It was listed on the National Register of Historic Places in 1974.

It is a two-story house with a one-story wing to the rear, built of squared sandstone quarried by John Kinner, who came to Colorado alone as a young man from Rock Island, Illinois. He was a teamster on the Old Santa Fe Trail before establishing his large and successful ranch in the Plum Creek Valley. His family was originally from Scotland.

He married Elizabeth Field who was the adopted daughter of Sarah Coberly (the mother-in-law of Silas Soule).

The five high and narrow bays on the main facade reflect German style.

It is located at 6694 Perry Park Rd.
