= First National Bank of Douglas County =

Historic building in Colorado, US

- U.S. National Register of Historic Places
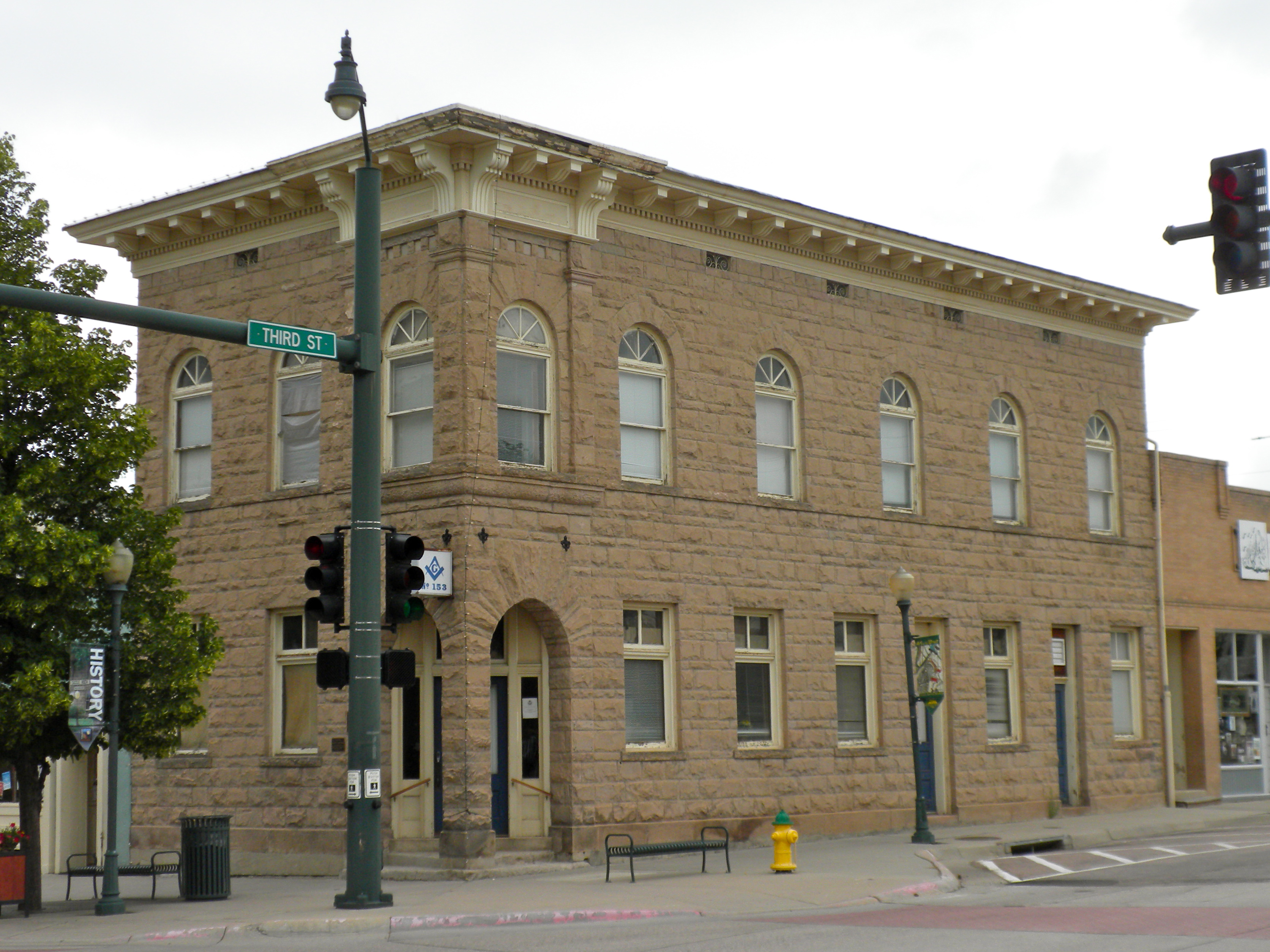

- Location within Colorado
- Location: 300 Wilcox St., Castle Rock, Colorado
- Coordinates: 39.37243°N 104.85974°W
- Area: less than one acre
- Built: 1904
- Architect: George Louis Bettcher
- Architectural style: Late Victorian
- NRHP reference No.: 95000440
- Added to NRHP: April 14, 1995

The First National Bank of Douglas County, at 300 Wilcox St. in Castle Rock, Colorado, in Douglas County, Colorado, was built in 1904. It was listed on the National Register of Historic Places in 1995.

It was designed by architect George Louis Bettcher. It was deemed

significant for its architecture. It is an excellent intact example of the Late Victorian design with many elements of Romanesque Revival style.... The two-part corner commercial building is faced with rock-faced rhyolite stone that was quarried outside of Castle Rock. This building was the second home for the bank and represents economic shifts occurring in the community as the bank sought a more permanent home during a time of community growth and as the bank shifted from out of state "back East" investors to local ownership.

It has also been known as the Masonic Building. Its second floor was originally used as a meeting hall for local fraternal organizations. The building was vacant for three years starting in 1933, then purchased by the local Masons.

It is the only architect-designed Romanesque Revival building in Castle Rock.

== See also ==
- National Register of Historic Places listings in Douglas County, Colorado
