= Samuel Dyer House =

Historic house in Colorado, US

- U.S. National Register of Historic Places
- Colorado State Register of Historic Properties
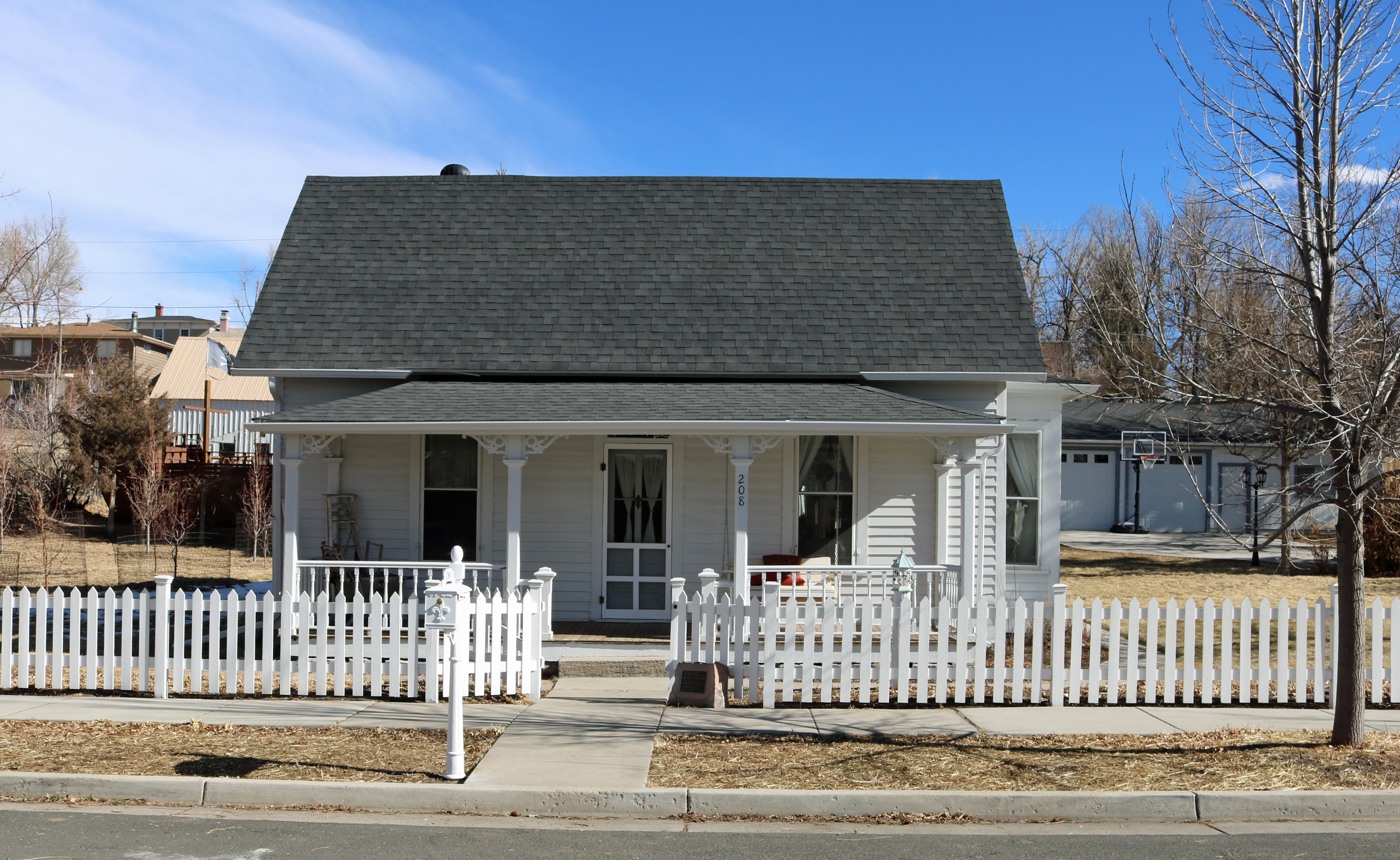
- The house in 2017

- Location within Colorado
- Location: 208 Cantril Street; Castle Rock, Colorado
- Coordinates: 39°22′18″N 104°51′22″W
- Built: c. 1875
- Built by: Samuel Dyer
- Architectural style: Queen Anne style architecture
- NRHP reference No.: 16000836
- CSRHP No.: 5DA.653

Significant dates
- Added to NRHP: December 13, 2016
- Designated CSRHP: September 16, 2016

The Samuel Dyer House is a historic Queen Anne-style house in Castle Rock, Colorado, United States. The house's original portion was constructed c. 1875 by Samuel Dyer, the son of the itinerant Methodist minister and Colorado pioneer John Lewis Dyer. It is thought to be the oldest surviving house in Castle Rock. It is located within the Craig and Gould neighborhood, with the property the only one that still retains its original size and outbuildings.

The house has undergone several restoration efforts and remains a private residence. The 2013–2017 restoration work overlapped with similar work undertaken at the adjacent Benjamin Hammar House. It was added to the Colorado State Register of Historic Properties and the National Register of Historic Places in 2016. The barn on the property is operated as an inn.

== Description ==
The Samuel Dyer House is located at 208 Cantril Street on the northeast corner with 2nd Street in the residential Craig and Gould neighborhood in Castle Rock, Colorado. It is thought to be the oldest surviving house in Castle Rock. It is an example of Queen Anne-style architecture, which favors simpler designs compared to other styles. The house sits on four lots. Also on the property are an ice house, a chicken coop/garage, and a barn. Once the norm, the Samuel Dyer House and its multi-lot parcel is now the only remaining property in the neighborhood that retains its original parcel size and outbuildings. The house and these outbuildings contribute to its listing on the National Register of Historic Places (NRHP), while another garage – constructed later – is a non-contributing resource. It is also recognized as a Town of Castle Rock Historic Landmark by ordinance.

The house has a rhyolite stone foundation. The cornerstone of this foundation beneath the western one-and-one-half story part of the house has "1875" carved into one face, indicating that it is probably the original section of the house. The cornerstone is not visible unless one climbs under the house's western porch, which was a later addition. The house's walls are wooden, with weatherboard covering portions. The house presently has a cross-gabled roof with eaves, the result of additions made in 1893 and 1901. The 1893 addition was constructed to form the northeast part of the house. The 1901 addition added a kitchen space east of the 1893 addition. A further addition, thought to date from 1932 due to inscriptions found on baseboard, added a bathroom to the kitchen addition.

A succession of porches have been present on the south side of the house. The first was on the 1893 addition's south side. Based on archaeological findings, this was added there sometime between 1893 and 1901 before being infilled sometime between 1901 and 1937. Another south-facing porch, added to the 1901 addition, was infilled in 1987 as part of the construction of a bathroom addition.

The 35-foot (11 m) water well, located by the back porch, is covered by a trap-door screen. In keeping with the period, the house likely had an outhouse; the site of this possible structure and its associated privy pit are presently unknown.

The barn now functions as an inn as the Dyer Inn.

== History ==
Samuel Dyer, who was born in Illinois in 1843, was the son of John Lewis Dyer, an itinerant Methodist preacher and earlier Colorado pioneer. Having lost a leg at the Battle of Fredericksburg during the American Civil War, Samuel Dyer moved to Colorado after the war's conclusion. He settled in Douglas County, where he became the county's clerk and recorder in 1874. He maintained both a ranch and drugstore and purchased the property on Cantril Street due to difficulties commuting to and from his work. Shortly after marrying Ester Alexander in 1881, the Dyers moved to Pueblo. They would then move to Cripple Creek in 1891, where he died in 1902. He is buried next to his father in Castle Rock's Cedar Hill Cemetery.

In 1888, the house and property were sold by Ester Dyer to William B. Chamberlain, who would be responsible for the majority of the house's additions. Chamberlain, who was born in Illinois in 1862, had moved to Larkspur in Douglas County in 1873 with his parents and four siblings. Chamberlain established his own homestead southeast of Castle Rock in 1887 and acquired the Dyer property to serve as his house in town. He moved into the house permanently in 1893, the same year that he undertook his first additions to the house. He was elected as the county's treasurer four times between 1902 and 1909. William Chamberlain died in 1945, whereupon the house became the property of his wife, Amelia. She continued living in the house until she sold it to Charles A. and Alta Louise Weekly in 1951.

Shy Properties purchased the property in 1979 and leased the house until 1984. Shy Properties then informed the Castle Rock government that they wanted the town to either move the house or permit it to be torn down. Castle Rock subsequently purchased the property with the goal of converting it into a public park and museum. A vote on a new tax to support this plan failed and the town sold the property to John and Fleta Knockels in 1985. The Knockels performed maintenance on the house, making updates to both its interior and exterior. This included the construction of a garage on the property's southeast corner in 1986 and a bathroom addition in 1987.

In 2013, the Brittany and David Braun purchased the house for $250,000 ($331,000 in 2024). They moved into the house with their children and undertook a four-year-long restoration of the property that largely concluded in 2017. The adjacent Benjamin Hammar House, another private residence also on the NRHP, underwent restoration work under the Decker family's ownership. Following the Deckers's arrival, they and the Brauns began having dinner together every other Monday night and exchanging tools.

== See also ==
- National Register of Historic Places listings in Douglas County, Colorado
