= Benjamin Hammar House =

Historic house in Colorado, US

- U.S. National Register of Historic Places
- Colorado State Register of Historic Properties
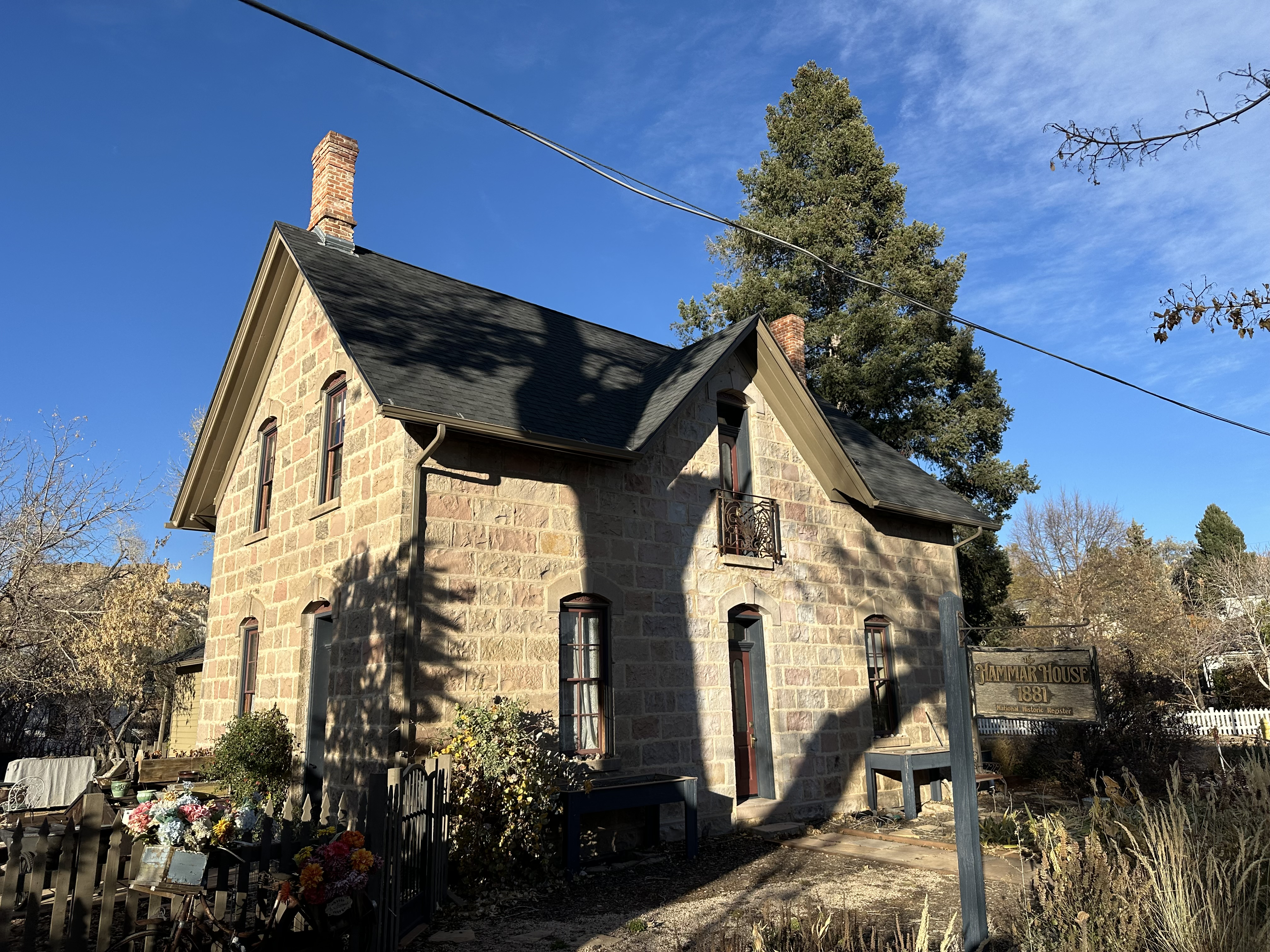
- The house in 2025

- Location within Colorado
- Location: 203 Cantril Street; Castle Rock, Colorado
- Coordinates: 39°22′18″N 104°51′23″W
- Built: 1881 (Note: Described as built in 1887 in its National Register of Historic Places registration form, the house has since been described as constructed in 1881. An October 1881 advertisement in a Castle Rock newspaper used "Hammar's stone house" as a landmark.)
- Built by: Benjamin Hammar
- Architectural style: Victorian, Italianate
- NRHP reference No.: 92001847
- CSRHP No.: 5DA.645
- Added to NRHP: February 3, 1993

The Benjamin Hammar House is a historic one-and-a-half-story stone and frame residence in Castle Rock, Colorado, United States. The stonemason Benjamin Hammar constructed the house in 1881 in the Craig and Gould neighborhood. The Victorian- and Italianate-style building utilizes locally sourced pink and grey rhyolite cut by Hammar in an ornamental fashion. The Benjamin Hammar House was listed on the National Register of Historic Places in 1993 and is on the Colorado State Register of Historic Properties.

The house was acquired in 1902 by George E. Alexander. One of the first practicing physicians in the region, Alexander practiced medicine from the house until his death in 1947, leading the building to sometimes be referred to as the Doctor's House. The house underwent restoration during its ownership by the Oberlin family in the late 20th century. While owned by the Decker family, it has undergone further preservation and renovation work in the 21st century, coincident to similar work at the adjacent Samuel Dyer House. The Benjamin Hammar House remains a private residence.

== Description ==
The Benjamin Hammar House is built on a property consisting of two lots located at 203 Cantril Street in the residential Craig and Gould neighborhood of Castle Rock, Colorado. Part of the northern lot, which contained the property's barn, was sold separately in the 1980s. The house is across the street from the Samuel Dyer House. Built to an irregular plan in the Victorian and Italianate styles, the Benjamin Hammar House originally comprised two sections: the southern section was built in stone utilizing local Douglas County–quarried rhyolite, while the smaller northern wing is constructed of wooden frame. Each section stands at one and a half stories tall and possesses a gable roof which intersects with the other. Both sections were part of the original construction.

The stone section forms the southern portion of the residence. Rectangular in shape, the stone is pink and grey in color. Contrast exists within the house's stonework, with Hammar roughly dressing the wall surface stones, adding rustication to the foundation, and smoothly cutting the sills and lintels. This section's south facade is in a symmetrical three-bay design. This facade's windows are set in stone sills and done in four-over-four and double-hung wood sash. Above each of these windows is a segmental dress-stone arches with a raised keystone. Eastlake-style carving is used on the reveals of the arches.

The main entrance is located on the house's southern front, where it is recessed into the facade and distinguished with a cross-gable roof above it. The wooden door of this entrance is glazed and paneled and has a transom. A wooden porch with a frieze of flat boards, not originally part of the house, was found at this entrance. The porch possessed a balustrade built with square posts and railings. It was surmounted by a small balcony.

Prior to the work under the Deckers starting in 2015, the interior measured 2,564 ft^{2} (238.2 m^{2}). Within the stone section, are two brick chimneys, one each protruding from the east and west of that section's roof ridge. The Deckers work included the construction of a garage and an addition in the same types of materials used in the original structure.

At the time of the house's application for inclusion on the National Register of Historic Places in 1992, the flooring and surviving original woodwork were in pine. The northern section comprised two rooms on the first floor and one on the second.

== History ==
The house was built in 1881 by the stonemason Benjamin Hammar for himself and his wife, Isabella. From 1872, rhyolite quarries represented a substantial proportion of the industry in and around Castle Rock in Douglas County, Colorado. Located between the Front Range Urban Corridor's primary population centers of Denver and Colorado Springs, Douglas County drew the attention of the Denver & Rio Grande Railway. The presence of the railroad allowed for the rhyolite to be shipped from Castle Rock's Madge, O'Brien, and Santa Fe quarries for use in prominent buildings across Colorado and other states.

Benjamin Hammar played a prominent role in the development of Castle Rock and its rhyolite industry. He was one of the owners of the 1881-established Castle Rock Stone Company, became the owner of the Santa Fe quarry, and built several Rio Grande Railroad depots, including the Castle Rock Depot and the original Denver Union Station. While other rhyolite residences are found in Castle Rock, it is unknown if Hammar was involved in their construction. Hammar utilized his expertise in stonemasonry to add ornamentation to the Cantril Street house. Local newspapers reports indicate that the house served as a regular host of social gatherings during the Hammars' occupancy there. Hammar operated a sheep ranch, resulting in tension with local cattle ranchers. Following threatening letters published in local newspapers, the Hammars sold their stone home in July 1889 and moved their sheep ranching to elsewhere in Douglas County.

Following two other owners who succeeded the Hammars, the physician George E. Alexander bought the property in 1902. Upon his arrival in Fort Collins, Colorado, from Connecticut in 1889, Alexander became one of the first physicians to practice medicine in the state. Alexander practiced out of the Cantril Street house after he moved to Castle Rock, leading to the home being occasionally referred to as the Doctor's House. He maintained his office in the house's front east room, while patients waited in the large foyer. Alexander used a barn on the property to store first a horse and buggy and later an automobile, both of which he used to call on his patients. It was in that barn that Alexander's wife, who had been a leading figure in the community and suffered from depression following the birth of her third child, hanged herself. Alexander married another woman, named Nina, and continued to work from the house until he died in 1947, by which point he was the oldest practicing doctor in Colorado and among the longest-practicing doctors in the United States. The house was owned by Alexander and his family for 88 years.

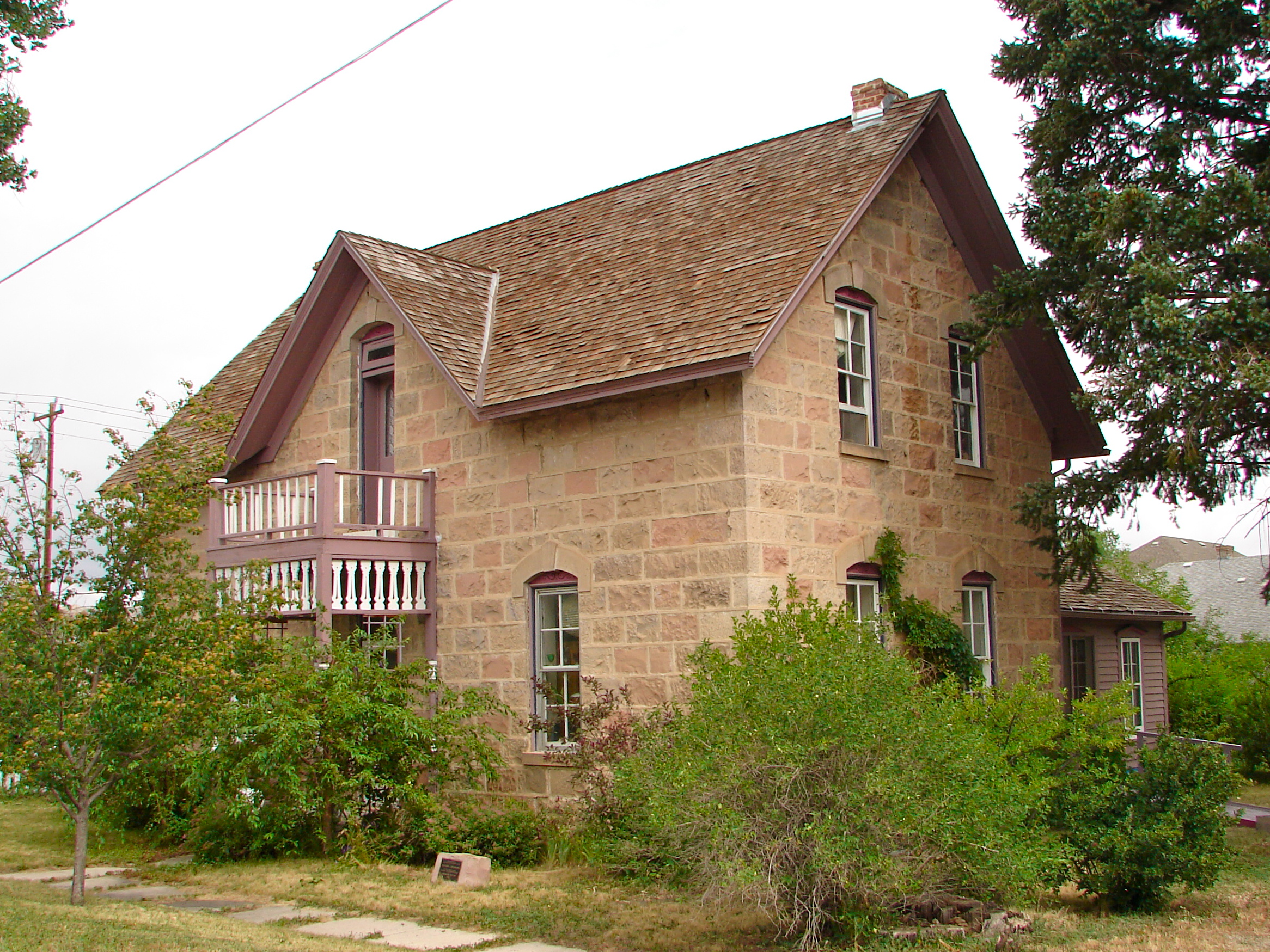
The Benjamin Hammar House in 2010 with wooden porch present

In 1990, Mildred "Starr" and Lionell Oberlin acquired the house from Kay McKinster, Nina's granddaughter (who was not related by blood to George Alexander). It was the third historic house that the Oberlins lived in and renovated. The Oberlins, who brought a large collection of antiques with them to Castle Rock, helped establish the Castle Rock Historical Society. They helped raise the funds required to purchase the Castle Rock Depot for use as the society's museum, served on the town's Preservation Board, and helped pass the town's Historic Preservation Ordinance. The town of Castle Rock awarded the couple the Cornerstone Tribute Award in recognition of their efforts.

The house was nominated for the National Register of Historic Places (NRHP) by the Oberlins in 1992 and added to the register on February 3, 1993. Sometime between 1889 and 1900, the wooden porch over the main entrance was added. It remained the house's only architectural alteration at the time of its addition to the register. For a time, the Benjamin Hammar House was the only residence on the NRHP in Castle Rock. It is recognized as a Town of Castle Rock Historic Landmark by town ordinance and on the Colorado State Register of Historic Properties.

During the fiscal year 2010, History Colorado gave the town of Castle Rock $3,000 (equivalent to $4,429 in 2025) for historic structure assessment and $8,648 (equivalent to $12,768 in 2025) for structural stabilization and electrical upgrade work on the Benjamin Hammar House. In 2012, the town of Castle Rock's city council gave one of its annual awards for design to the house, recognizing it for historic preservation.

Bruce and Kimbley Decker purchased the house in August 2014 and moved from Parker into the home the following January. They acquired the home with the intention of restoring elements of the property to their original design. They also received approval from the town to make additions to the structure, including the addition of a detached garage in a style complementary to the main house. The adjacent Samuel Dyer House, another private residence now also on the NRHP, underwent restoration work under the Braun family's ownership between 2013 and 2017. Following the Deckers's arrival, they and the Brauns began having dinner together every other Monday night and exchanging tools.

== See also ==
- National Register of Historic Places listings in Douglas County, Colorado
