= Lower Louviers and Chicken Alley =

Historic house in Delaware, United States

- U.S. National Register of Historic Places
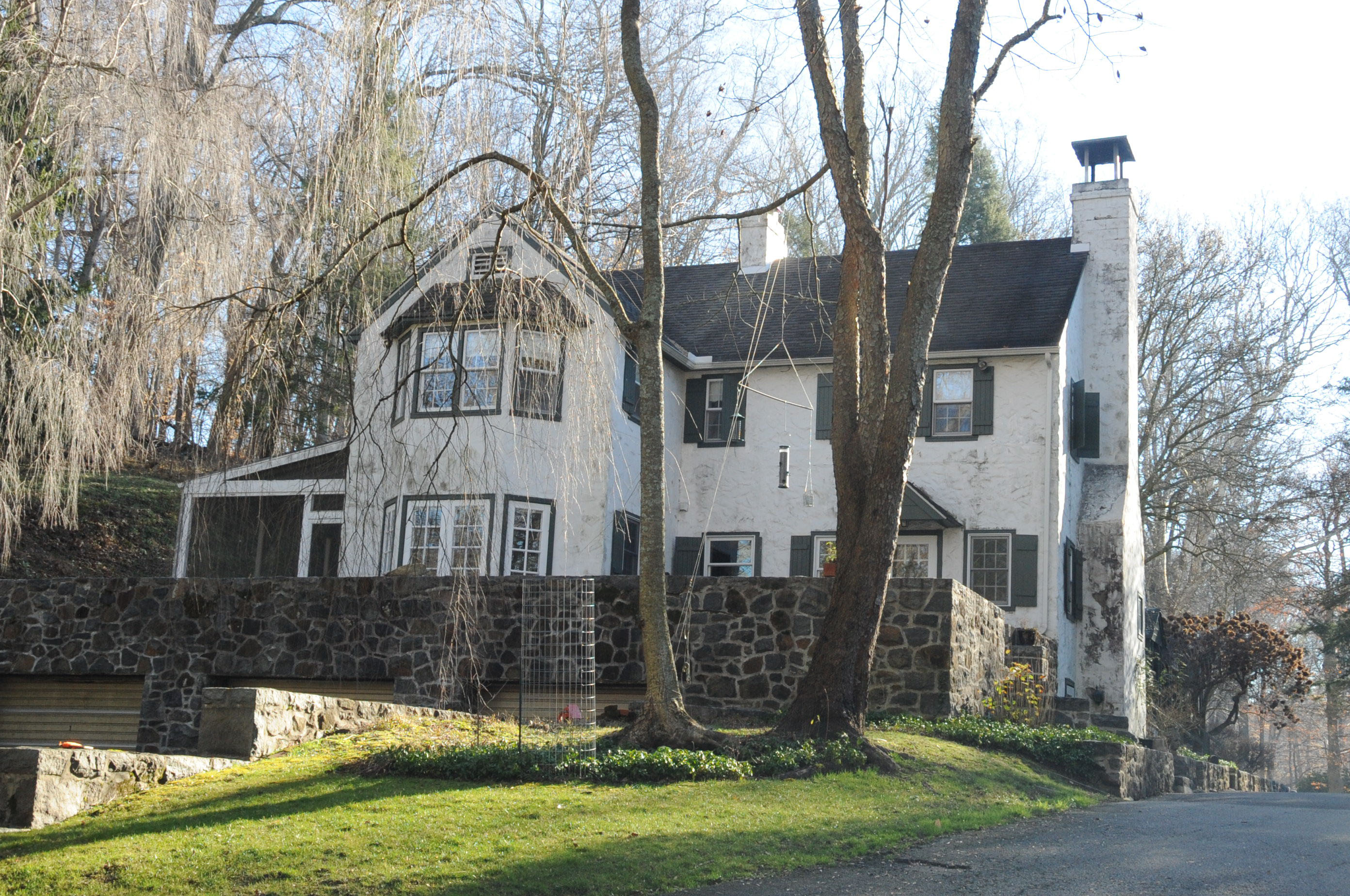
- Lower Louviers

- Location within Delaware Location within the United States
- Location: 1 Black Gates Rd., near Wilmington, Delaware
- Coordinates: 39.78513°N 75.57397°W
- Area: 51 acres (21 ha)
- Built: 1811
- Architectural style: Federal
- NRHP reference No.: 72000293
- Added to NRHP: February 1, 1972

Lower Louviers and Chicken Alley, also known as Louviers and Duck Street, is a historic home located near Wilmington in New Castle County, Delaware. It was added to the National Register of Historic Places in 1972.

== History ==
The house was built in 1811 and is a two-story to three-story, five-bay, stuccoed stone dwelling. The three center bays project slightly from the main body of the home. In 1935, a kitchen wing was added to the other end of the residence, plus a gated wall and garage.

The home was owned by members of the prominent Du Pont family. At the back of the house is "Chicken Alley", an excellent example of a 19th-century workers' row house.

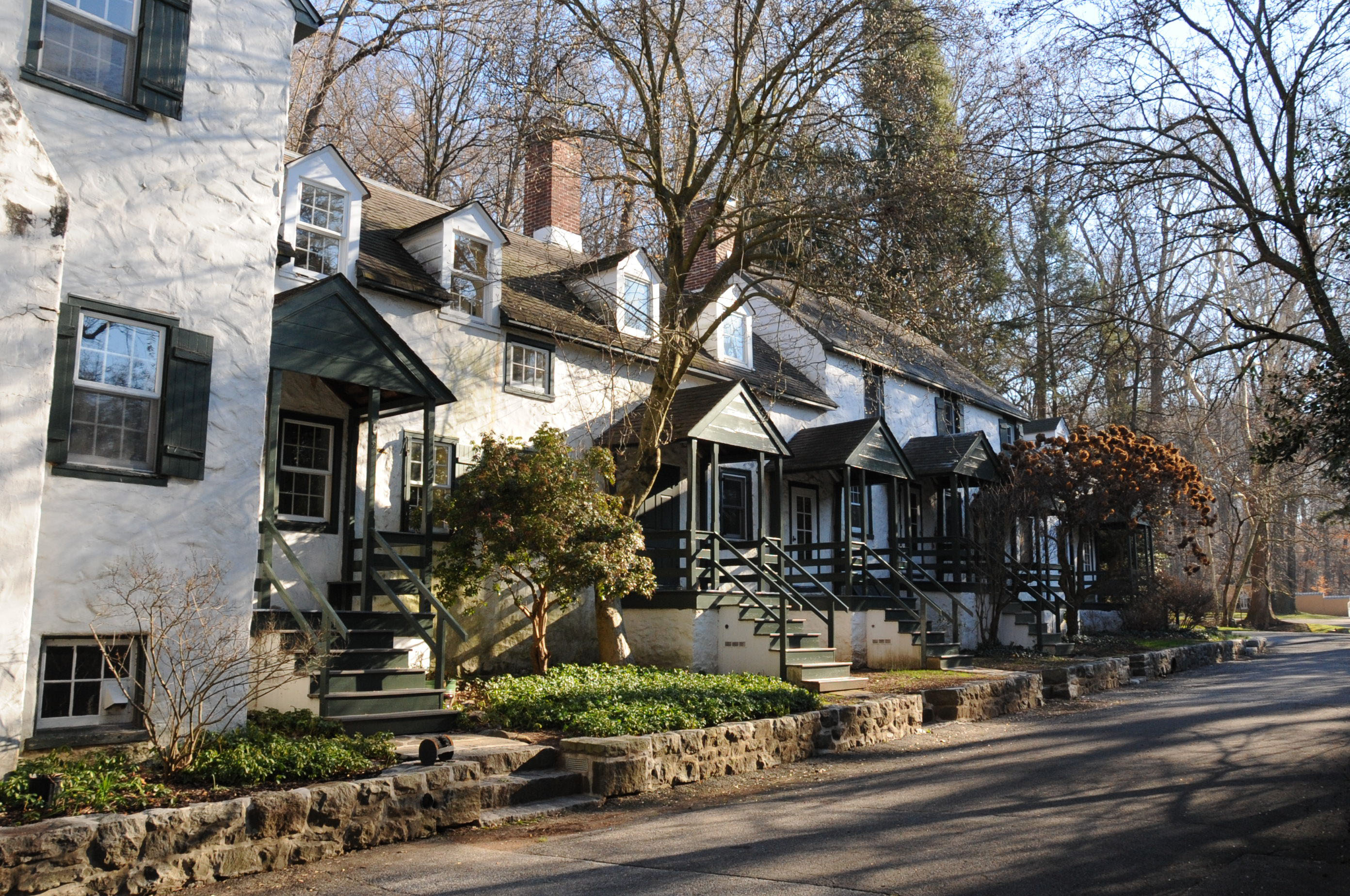
Chicken Alley

== See also ==
- Louviers (Wilmington, Delaware)
