= Church of St. Philip-in-the-Field and Bear Canon Cemetery =

Historic site in Douglas County, Colorado

- U.S. National Register of Historic Places
- Colorado State Register of Historic Properties
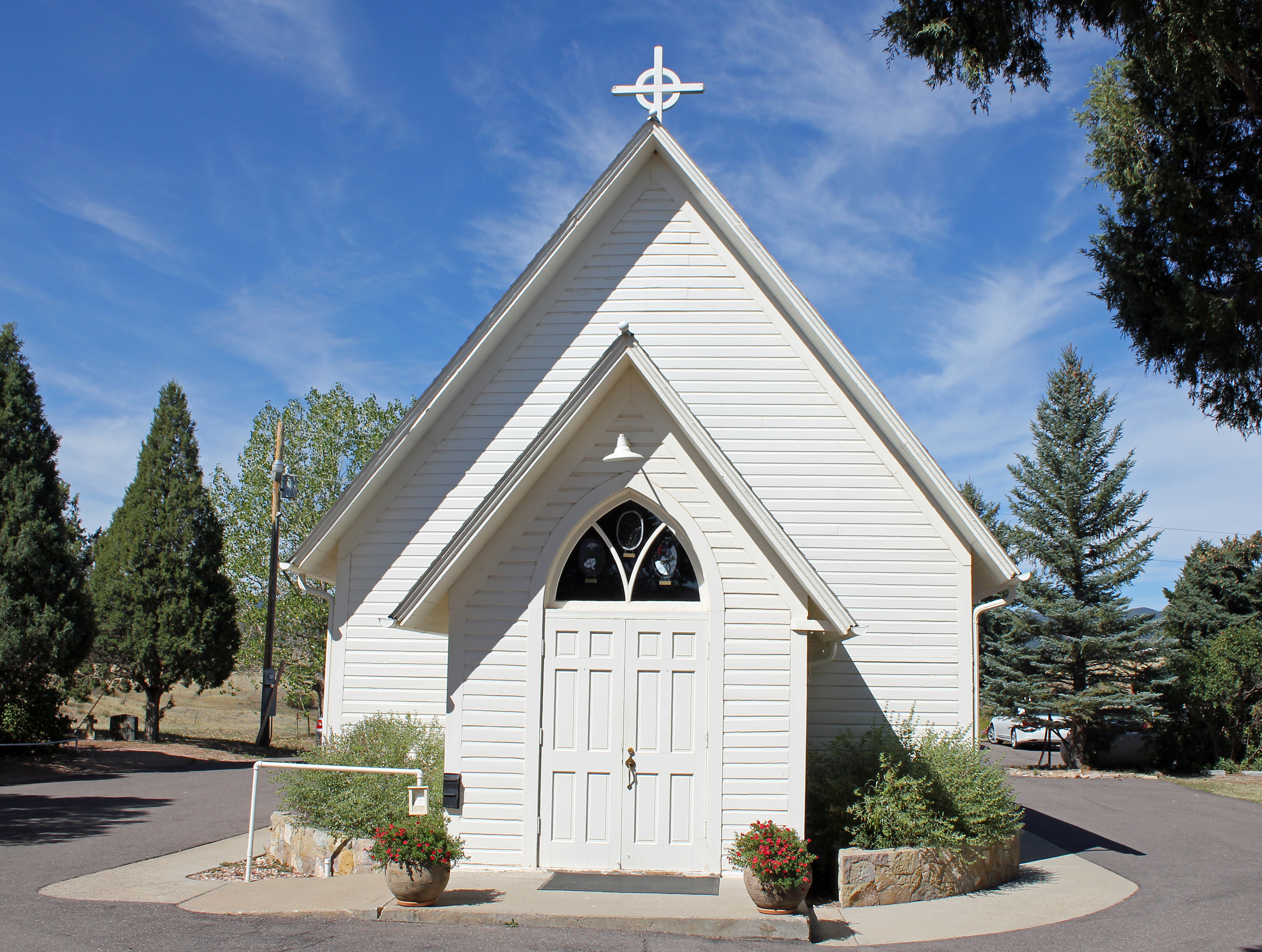

- Location within Colorado Location within the United States
- Nearest city: Sedalia, Colorado
- Coordinates: 39°22′5″N 104°57′33″W
- Area: 5 acres (2.0 ha)
- Built: 1872
- Built by: Grout, N.S.
- NRHP reference No.: 73000471
- CSRHP No.: 5DA.217
- Added to NRHP: April 11, 1973

The Church of St. Philip-in-the-Field and Bear Canon Cemetery is a historic church building and cemetery in Sedalia, Colorado. The church was affiliated with the Episcopal Diocese of Colorado.

== Building and history ==
The building was added to the National Register of Historic Places in 1973. It is a white frame clapboard building, with a 22 by 30 feet (6.7 m × 9.1 m) nave built in 1872 of rough lumber hauled over a difficult trail.

Saint Philip in-the-field Episcopal church has been at this location since 1888, but construction on the church dates back all the way to 1872. In that year, trustees at the newly formed Bear Cañon Methodist Congregation commissioned Newton S. Grout, a former drummer boy for the Union Army, to construct the first church of Douglas County. As the main carpenter of the church's construction, he wished to fashion its design after a smaller church in Maine where he had worshipped as a child. With plenty of initial money and labor donated to the construction, the exterior was quickly finished, but a later lack of funding prevented the completion of the inside. Despite this setback, the church opened that same year, using planks supported by boxes as pews and was used by various faiths. In 1884, the long-delayed interior building was resumed but didn't last very long when a man posing as a Methodist minister disappeared with the $600 of fundraising money meant for the church's construction. Two years later in 1886, Bishop Reverend William Spaulding of the Episcopal Diocese of Colorado traded St. Mark's Church in Bergen Park (modern-day Evergreen) for the unfinished church. William Curtis and John Harris were put in charge to supervise the construction. Curtis drew the plans and Harris worked as the carpenter, and when the work was completed, the interior included a sanctuary, sacristy, vestibule, pews, chancel, altar, communion rail, and brick chimney. The church was dedicated to Saint Philip in-the-field and held its opening services on December 23, 1888. The surrounding Bear Cañon cemetery was established in 1870, and the first still identifiable graves were laid in 1874 in the Northwest corner of the cemetery. By the 1970s, five generations of families and veterans from five wars had been buried in the cemetery. The mission center behind the church was built in 1970. On April 11, 1973, both the church and cemetery were placed on the National Register of Historic Places.
