= Louis Bettcher =

American inventor and manufacturer

Louis A. Bettcher, Jr. (May 7, 1914 – December 14, 1999) was an American inventor and manufacturer of handheld powered circular knives used in the meat processing industry. He was the founder and president of Bettcher Industries, Inc., a worldwide manufacturer of precision cutting and trimming tools for meat processing and industrial applications.

== Early years ==
Bettcher was born on May 7, 1914, in Electra, Texas. His father, Louis A. Bettcher, Sr., who died when Louis was 8 years old, was a Church of Christ preacher who had studied engineering before switching to the ministry. His mother, Cora Lee Hall Bettcher, who lived to the age of 93, was a school teacher and lecturer. From the age of eight through his high school years, he was raised in the town of Elyria, Ohio.

He worked on truck farms doing general farming, butchering and blacksmithing until he graduated from high school in 1931. In 1932, Bettcher hitchhiked to the state of Arizona where he worked as a cowboy. He was also a woodcutter, a hard rock miner, and a laborer building mule trains used in the Grand Canyon.

Returning to Elyria in 1936, Bettcher was employed as an apprentice tool and die maker. He also started taking night courses at Fenn College (now Cleveland State University). During 12 years of night school, he studied machine tool design, metallurgy and business. In a 1988 newspaper interview, Bettcher stated, “Even as a child, everyone called me an inventor.”

== First years in business ==
At the age of 29, Bettcher established Bettcher Dieweld Company with an investment of $800. Founded in 1944, the business was a small machine shop located in the meatpacking district on Cleveland’s West Side. The company’s first products were jigs, fixtures, tools, dies and special machinery. “I made $883 profit my first week, but there were also tough times. I believed in myself, so I didn’t give up when times got rough.”

== Invention of handheld powered meat trimmers ==
In 1954, Bettcher invented a handheld powered circular knife and introduced it to meat processing plants. Originally called the “Dumbutcher,” this name was quickly dropped in favor of the more appealing “Whizard” brand name. Today there are thousands of Whizard trimmers in use throughout the world, and the company, today named Bettcher Industries, Inc., is a leading worldwide manufacturer of precision cutting and trimming tools for the meat processing industry and industrial applications.

Bettcher had more than 400 patents to his name.

== Later years ==
In a 1969 newspaper interview, Bettcher spoke of how his own father had advised him “not to work or try to create things solely for the love of money. Do it with the thought in mind of how much good you can do for the most people. This opens up the creative channels.”

Bettcher died on December 14, 1999, at the age of 85.
