= Louviers, Colorado =

Unincorporated community in Douglas County, CO, USA

- Census-designated place
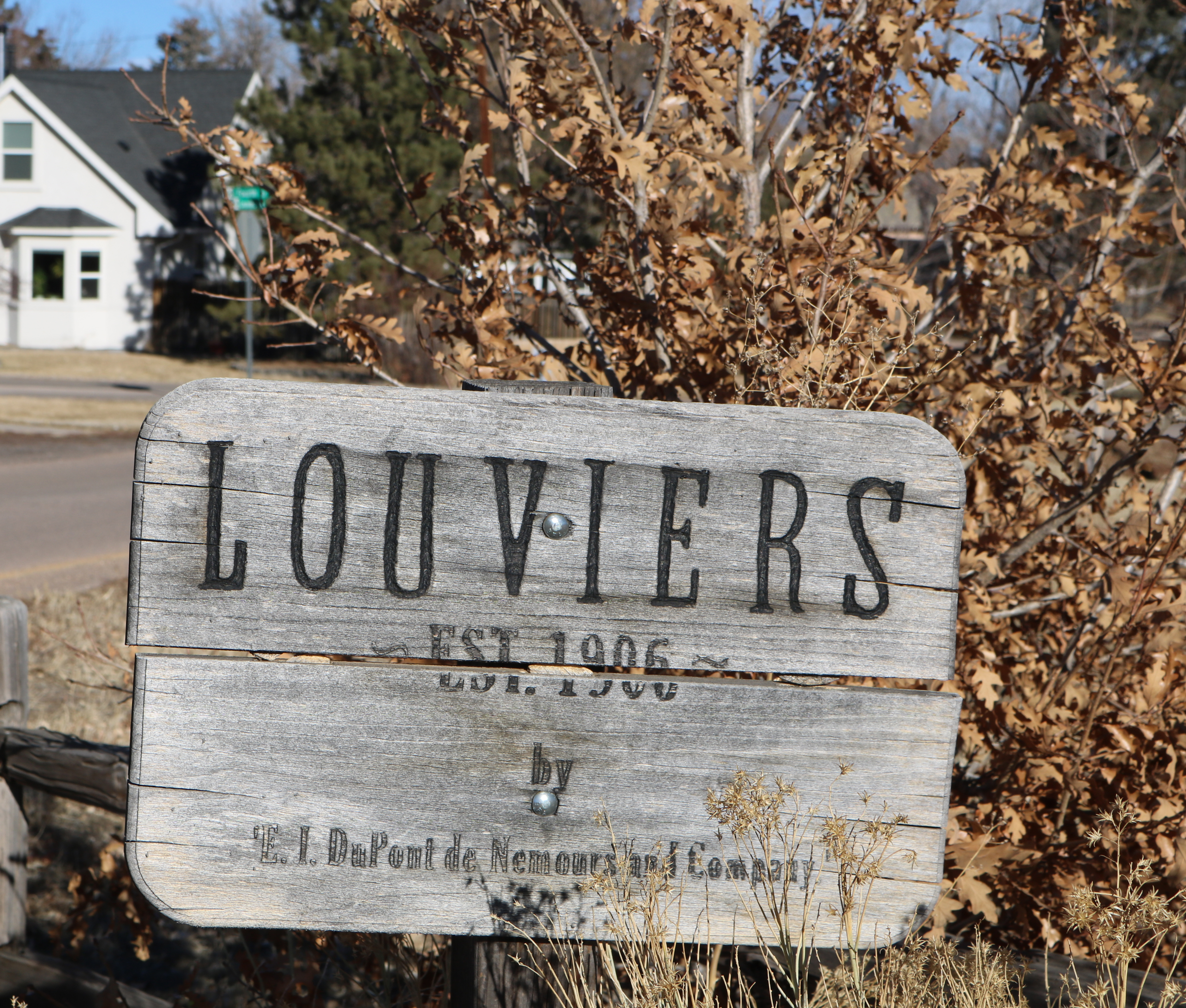
- A sign marking the entrance to Louviers.

- Location of the Louviers CDP in Douglas County, Colorado
- Coordinates: 39°28′48″N 104°59′58″W
- Country: United States
- State: Colorado
- County: Douglas
- Founded: 1906

Government
  - Type: Unincorporated community

Area
  - Total: 1.580 sq mi (4.093 km^{2})
  - Land: 1.580 sq mi (4.093 km^{2})
  - Water: 0 sq mi (0.000 km^{2})
- Elevation: 5,614 ft (1,711 m)

Population (2020)
  - Total: 293
  - Density: 185/sq mi (71.6/km^{2})
- Time zone: UTC-7 (MST)
  - Summer (DST): UTC-6 (MDT)
- ZIP Code: 80131
- Area codes: 303 & 720
- GNIS feature ID: 2408145

Louviers is an unincorporated town, a post office, and a census-designated place (CDP) located in and governed by Douglas County, Colorado, United States. The CDP is a part of the Denver–Aurora–Lakewood, CO Metropolitan Statistical Area. The Louviers post office has the ZIP Code 80131 (post office boxes). At the United States Census 2020, the population of the Louviers CDP was 293.

== History ==
Louviers was laid out by the DuPont Company in 1906, and named after Louviers, the Delaware estate of the Du Pont family. The Louviers Post Office has been in operation since 1907.

== Geography ==
The eastern border of Louviers is U.S. Route 85, which leads north 20 miles (32 km) to the center of Denver and southeast 12 miles (19 km) to Castle Rock, the Douglas County seat.

The Louviers CDP has an area of 1,011 acres (4.093 km^{2}), all land.

== Demographics ==
The United States Census Bureau initially defined the Louviers CDP for the United States Census 2000.

Louviers CDP, Colorado
Year	Pop.	±%
2000	237	—
2010	269	+13.5%
2020	293	+8.9%
Source: United States Census Bureau

== Education ==
The Douglas County School District serves Louviers.

== See also ==
- Denver-Aurora-Boulder, CO Combined Statistical Area
- Denver-Aurora-Broomfield, CO Metropolitan Statistical Area
