= Reginald Sinclaire House =

- U.S. National Register of Historic Places
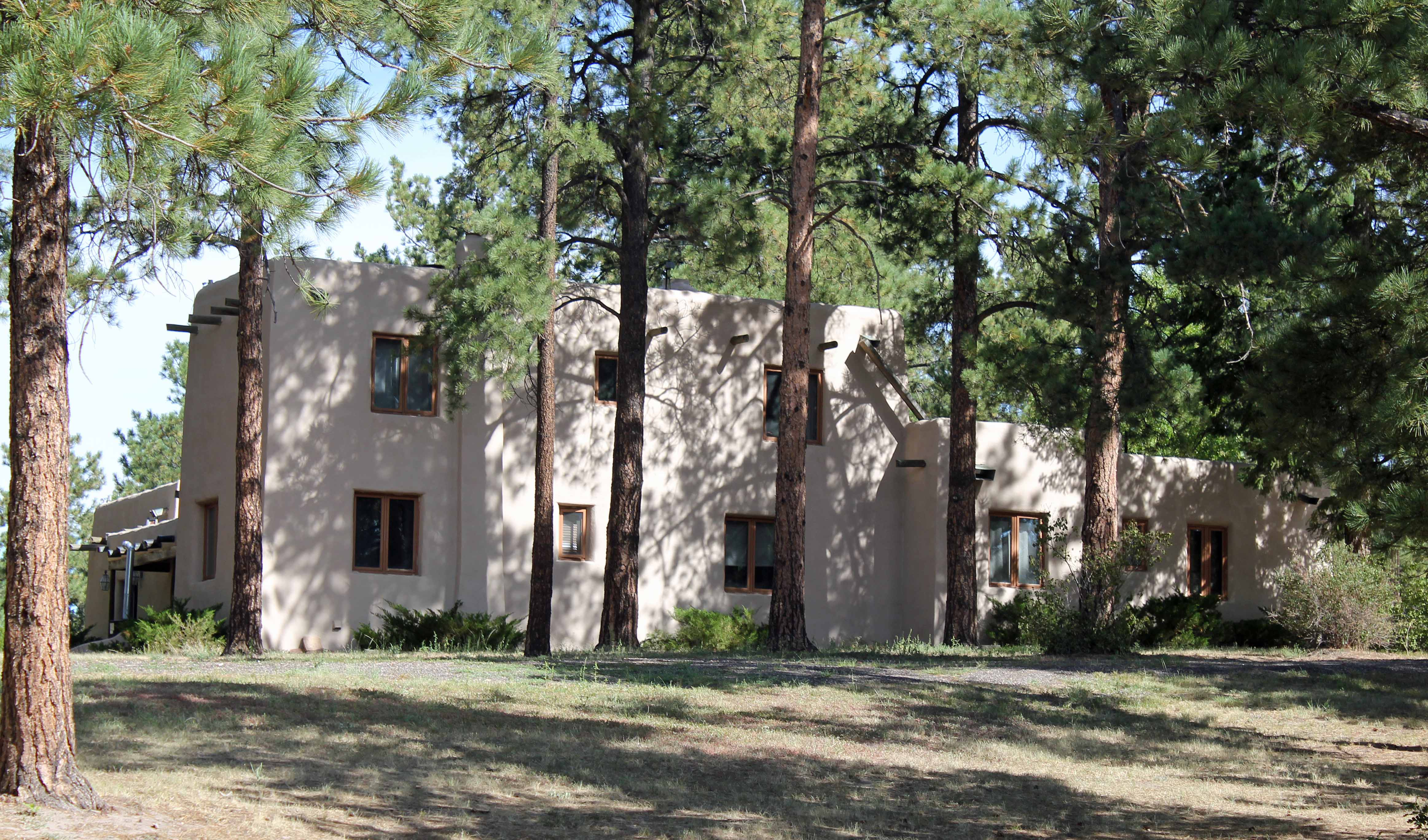

- Location within Colorado
- Location: 6154 Perry Park Rd., Larkspur, Colorado
- Coordinates: 39°16′20″N 104°56′39″W
- Area: 790 acres (3.2 km^{2})
- Built: 1931-1932
- Architectural style: Late 19th and 20th Century Revivals, Pueblo Revival
- NRHP reference No.: 91001418
- Added to NRHP: September 20, 1991

The Reginald Sinclaire House, at 6154 Perry Park Rd. in Larkspur, Colorado, was built in 1932. It was listed on the National Register of Historic Places in 1991.

It was a home of Reginald Sinclaire (b.1893), an aviator who is a member of the Colorado Aviation Hall of Fame. Sinclaire was a member of the Lafayette Flying Corps (of Americans flying for the French) during World War I and earned three Croix de Guerre medals with Palms.

The listing includes five contributing buildings, three non-contributing buildings, and five contributing structures.

The main house was built in 1931–32 in Pueblo Revival style. It is located on the crest of a hill, up a mile-long driveway from Perry Park Road. It is a two-story single-family house which served from 1932 to 1965 as home and main house for Sinclaire's 4,500 acres (18 km^{2}) horse ranch.
