= Victor Marie du Pont =

American politician (1767–1827)

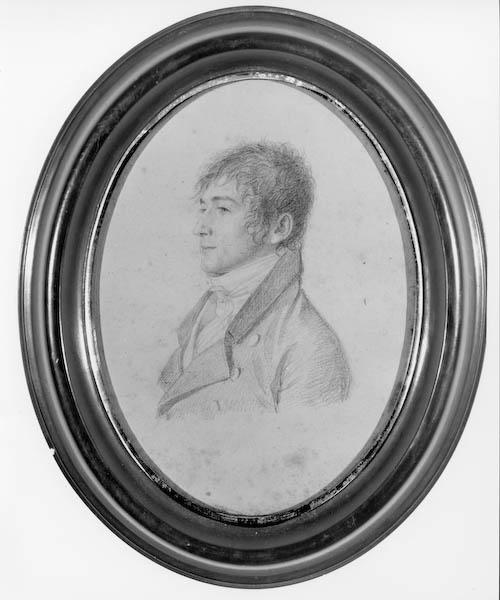
- Born: Victor Marie du Pont de Nemours; October 1, 1767; Paris, France
- Died: January 30, 1827 (aged 59); Philadelphia, Pennsylvania
- Occupations: Diplomat, businessman, politician
- Spouse: Gabrielle Joséphine de la Fite de Pelleport
- Children: Charles I. du Pont; Samuel Francis du Pont

Victor Marie du Pont de Nemours (October 1, 1767 – January 30, 1827) was a French American diplomat, politician, and businessman. He was also a member of the Delaware General Assembly, the founder of the Du Pont, Bauduy & Co., wool manufacturers, and brother of Éleuthère Irénée du Pont, the founder of the E.I. du Pont de Nemours Company.

== Early life and family ==
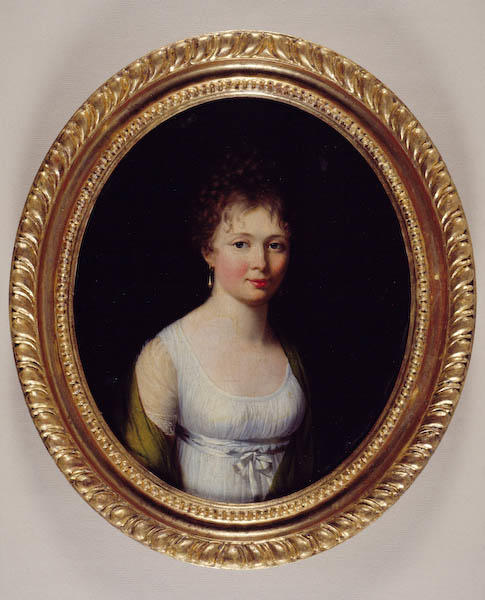
Gabrielle Josephine de la Fite de Pelleport

Victor Marie du Pont was born October 1, 1767, in Paris, France. He was the son of Pierre Samuel du Pont de Nemours and Nicole Charlotte Marie Louise le Dée. He married Gabrielle Joséphine de la Fite de Pelleport in 1794 and had five children: Amélie-Élisabeth (1796–1869), Samuel Francis (1799-1799), Charles Irénée (1797–1869), Samuel Francis (1803–1865), and Julia Sophie (1806–1882).

== Professional career ==
After 1784, du Pont worked with his father in King Louis XVI's Bureau of Commerce. There he had opportunities to travel around Europe and meet visiting friends of his father. In 1788 he began four years of work with the French minister to the United States in both New York City and Philadelphia. During this time, he wrote letters to his father analyzing the U.S. Constitution and the prospects for its ratification. Returning to Paris in 1793, he married and soon went back to the United States, this time as French Consul at Charleston, South Carolina. He remained there until 1797 when he was named French Consul-General at Philadelphia. However, he returned to France after not being recognized in the position by President John Adams.

For the next two years, du Pont assisted his father by preparing his entire family to immigrate to the United States. They finally sailed on the American Eagle, arriving in Newport, Rhode Island, on January 1, 1800. From there the father, two brothers, wives, and children went to live at Goodstay, a house purchased for them in Bergen Point, New Jersey. Many prospective business ideas for the du Ponts were conceived in the coming year at Goodstay, including his brother, Eleuthère, beginning a gunpowder business. du Pont and his brother returned to France for a year in 1801 to seek investors for the gunpowder business and various other business ventures. He returned to New York, established a trading company, Victor du Pont de Nemours & Co., and acted as an agent for Louis Pichon, the French Consul-General and chargé d'affairs, provisioning French troops seeking to quell the rebellion then going on in Haiti. This firm went into bankruptcy in 1808, as his many advances, including those to the French government, went unreimbursed. Next, du Pont tried his hand at farming and merchandising on the Genesee River valley of western New York.

In 1811, he moved with his family to Delaware and established residence at Louviers on the Brandywine Creek, across from the Eleutherian Mills of his brother. He established a woolen mill to manufacture cotton cloth. Eleuthère's partner, Pierre Bauduy and son-in-law, Ferdinand Bauduy, joined the business in 1813, and it became known as Du Pont, Bauduy & Co. Soon after arriving in Delaware, du Pont was elected to one of the New Castle County seats in the State House for the 1815, 1816, and 1817 sessions and later was elected to the State Senate for the 1821, 1822, and 1823 sessions.

== Death and legacy ==
Victor Marie du Pont died in Philadelphia on January 30, 1827, and is buried in the du Pont family cemetery near Greenville, Delaware. du Pont was a man "whose friends were everywhere." His son Charles took over management of the wool manufacturing business upon his death, and his other son, Samuel Francis, was a Rear Admiral in the U.S. Navy during the Civil War.

== See also ==
- Du Pont family
