= Bayou Gulch =

River in Colorado, United States

Coordinates: 39°26′03″N 104°46′01″W

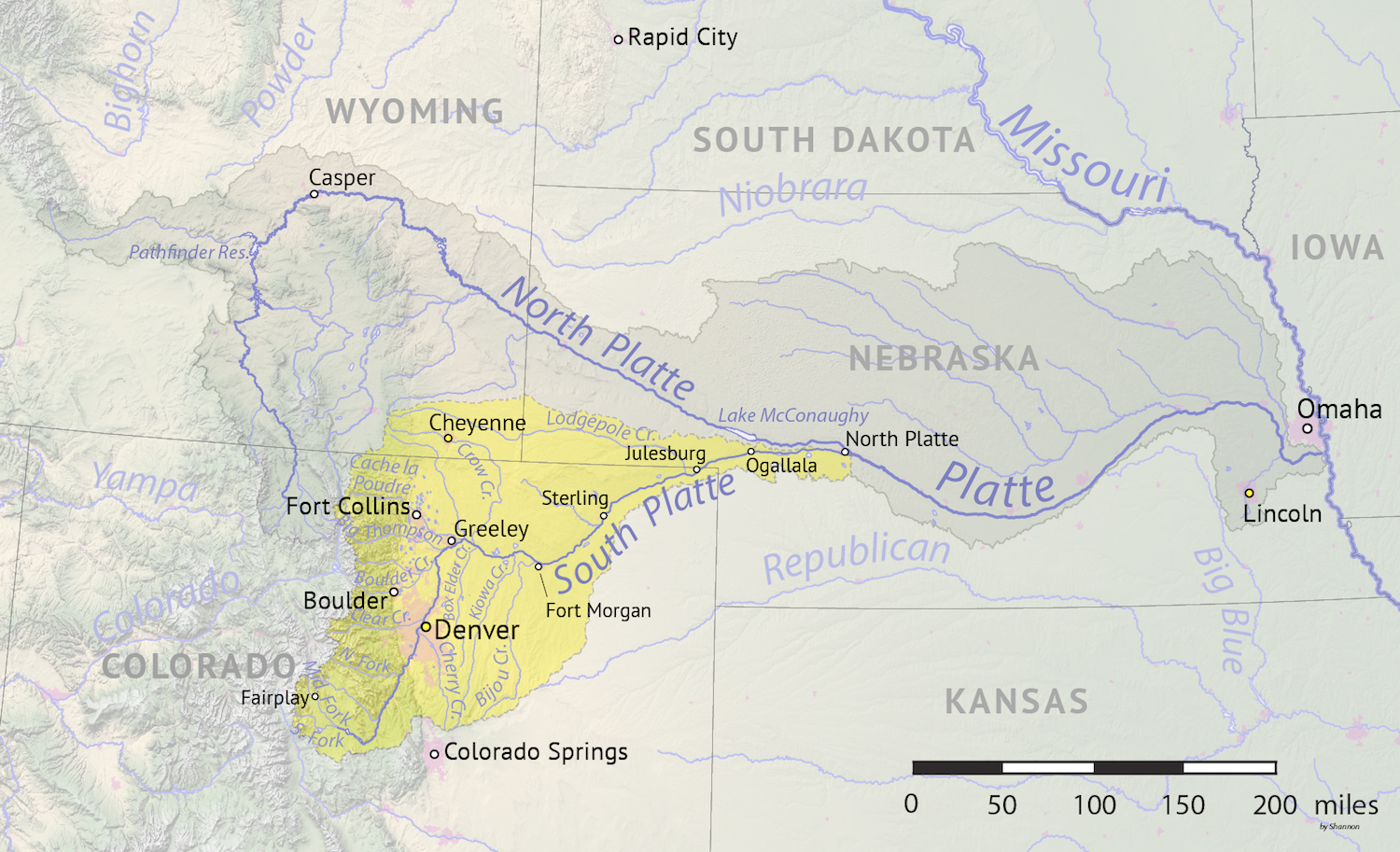
- South Platte River watershed including Bayou Gulch

Physical characteristics
- Source
  - location: Ponderosa Park, Colorado
- Mouth
  - location: Confluence with Cherry Creek
  - elevation: 6,000 ft (1,800 m)
- Length: 8 mi (13 km)

Basin features
- Progression: Cherry Creek-South Platte-Platte—Missouri—Mississippi
- Bayou Gulch
- U.S. National Register of Historic Places
- NRHP reference No.: 100005167
- Added to NRHP: April 13, 2020

Bayou Gulch is one of the tributaries of Cherry Creek, located mainly in the U.S. state of Colorado. It is part of the Colorado Eastern Plains. An archaeologically sensitive portion of the gulch was listed on the National Register of Historic Places in 2020.

== Description ==
The gulch is formed in Elbert County, Colorado, southeast of Denver and approximately 1 mile (1.6 km) southeast of Ponderosa Park.

The gulch flows west through Eastern Douglas County and into Cherry Creek. Bayou Gulch Road follows the streambed, which is generally dry.

== Recreational opportunities ==
There is a park that is next to the gulch with a playground basketball hoops, football field, baseball field, and hiking trails.

== See also ==
- List of rivers of Colorado
