= Bettcher Industries =

- Type: Private
- Industry: Manufacturer
- Founded: Cleveland, Ohio, U.S., (1944)
- Headquarters: Birmingham, Ohio, U.S.
- Number of locations: 2 manufacturing, 5 sales and service offices
- Area served: Worldwide
- Key people: Don Esch, President & CEO
- Products: meat trimmers, air-powered scissors, automated batter breaders, sifter tables, electric gyro knives, taxidermy fleshing trimmers
- Website: www.bettcher.com

Bettcher Industries, Inc. is a developer and manufacturer of cutting tools used in food processing operations and industrial applications. The company, often referred to as just Bettcher, manufactured the first mechanically powered hand-held meat trimmer in 1954. Since then, the company has introduced successive design generations of trimmers which are sold under the Whizard® and Bettcher Quantum® brand names and are used in meat processing plants in the United States and more than 50 other countries.

Bettcher also manufactures AirShirz® pneumatic scissors, designed to reduce the pain and fatigue associated with using manual scissors in repetitive cutting activities. AirShirz scissors are used in meat and poultry processing plants and in non-food applications such as cutting engineered fabrics, rubber, and wire mesh.

In addition, Bettcher manufactures equipment and products used in the foodservice industry including automated batter breading machines, sifter tables, and gyros electric knives. The company, which was founded by Louis A. Bettcher, Jr. in 1944, has manufacturing, warehouse, sales and/or service facilities in the United States as well as China, Brazil and Switzerland. Its international headquarters are in Birmingham, Ohio (USA).

In 2011, Bettcher formed Exsurco Medical, a business unit formed to develop and commercialize radial cutting technology that improves cadaveric tissue recovery and processing in the tissue bank industry.

== History ==
Bettcher Industries, Inc. was founded by Louis A. Bettcher in 1944 in the meatpacking district on Cleveland's West Side. The original name of the company was Bettcher Dieweld Company. What began as a tool and die shop soon grew into the making of cutting machinery.^{[1]} The first products manufactured by Bettcher were carcass splitters.

In 1954, Bettcher introduced the world's first mechanically-powered meat trimming hand tool, and by 1959, was selling the tools in Europe in addition to the United States. In 1960, the company won awards from the Salon International des Inventeurs (Brussels) and Concours International d’Inventions (Paris) as the “best American invention of the year.” Successive design generations of this tool have improved meat yields and productivity. Today's models include Whizard Series II Trimmers and the Bettcher Quantum Trimmer System, introduced in 2013.

Beginning in the 1960s, the company broadened its offerings through new product introductions. Notable among these was the 1995 introduction of AirShirz air-powered scissors, a major advancement in scissors technology, along with the development of automated batter breading machines for making fresh-breaded products in restaurant kitchens, which were introduced to the market in 1988. In 1994, Bettcher designed a powered knife for slicing meat cones for gyros sandwiches, which have become popular in ethnic restaurants inside and outside the United States.

In 1977, the company developed a non-metallic cut-resistant protective glove for meat processors and industrial applications. The glove had greater dexterity and was warmer to wear than the chain-mail glove products then in use. It manufactured these gloves for 17 years until selling the product line to Wells Lamont in 1996.

Recognizing that radial cutting technology was highly suited to the tissue bank industry, in 2011, Bettcher established Exsurco Medical, a business unit formed to develop and commercialize advanced medical tools for the recovery and processing of cadaveric tissue used for regenerative and reconstructive surgical procedures, including burn and trauma surgeries. The formation of this entity was supported in part with funding from the State of Ohio Office of Technology Investments’ Ohio Third Frontier initiative to promote the formation and growth of new technology-based businesses in the state.

Major milestones:

- 1944: Bettcher Industries founded as a tool and die shop on Cleveland's west side meatpacking district, with $800 in capital
- 1948: First product introduced – a carcass splitter
- 1954: First mechanically-powered meat trimming hand tool introduced
- 1959: Bettcher Industries begins exporting products to Europe
- 1960: Louis Bettcher wins awards from the Salon International des Inventeurs (Brussels) and Concours International d’Inventions (Paris) as the “best American invention of the year”
- 1965: Bettcher Industries posts $1 million in annual sales for the first time
- 1971: Company moves to present headquarters location in Birmingham, Ohio
- 1978: Establishes a European sales and service company in Switzerland
- 1995: Introduces AirShirz pneumatic scissors, which wins an Excellence in Productivity Improvement Award from the Institute of Industrial Engineers
- 1997: Receives ISO9001 Certification, awarded by Lloyd's Register Quality Assurance
- 1998: Receives the Ohio Governor's “E” Award for excellence in exporting
- 2000: Acquisition of Gainco, Inc., a Georgia-based manufacturer of weighing equipment and automated sizing, sorting and distribution systems
- 2001: Annual international sales volume matches domestic product sales for the first time
- 2002: In partnership with Beratung-Verkauf-Service, develops and introduces TrimVac, a trimming tool that vacuums away and removes spinal marrow and spinal membrane (BSE risk material) from the beef spinal canal
- 2003: Establishes a new sales and service company in Brazil
- 2005: With the establishment of sales representation in the Baltic States, Bettcher expands business operations to more than 50 countries around the world
- 2007: Establishes a sales and service company in Beijing, China
- 2008: Completion of $4 million expansion of company headquarters facilities including R&D, engineering, manufacturing and warehouse space
- 2011: Exsurco Medical business unit is created to manufacture medical tools for the recovery and processing of cadaveric tissue used in regenerative and reconstructive surgeries
- 2012: Establishes a direct sales and service company in Germany
- 2012: Establishes an employee stock ownership plan (ESOP), providing employees an ownership interest in the company
- 2012: Optimax® KC-1 Automatic Batter Breading Machines are recognized by the National Restaurant Association for noteworthy Kitchen Innovation.
- 2013: Bettcher Quantum® Trimmer System, the newest generation of Bettcher meat trimmers, motors and accessories, is launched in the United States and Europe
- 2013: Launched the Amalgatome MD Skin Recovery Device for Exsurco's Tissue Bank customers in the United States
- 2014: Named a “Top Workplace” company by Cleveland Plain Dealer newspaper for the third year in a row
- 2014: Bettcher Industries celebrates its 70th anniversary.
- 2014: Larry Bettcher retires as chairman and CEO. Don Esch is named new CEO.
- 2014: Bettcher Industries completes transition to 100% ESOP company. ^{[8]}
- 2015: Bettcher Industries' wholly owned subsidiary, Exsurco Medical, achieves ISO 13485 accreditation.
- 2017: Bettcher Industries is partially sold to private equity firm MPE (Morgenthaler Private Equity)
- 2021: MPE sells Bettcher Industries to private equity firm KKR

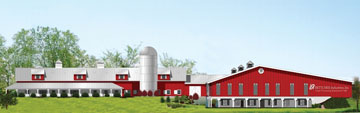
Bettcher Industries' corporate headquarters in Birmingham, Ohio, following a $4 million expansion completed in 2008.

== Regions, divisions and subsidiaries ==
Bettcher GmbH, Dierikon, Switzerland

Supplier of meat trimmers and cutting products in Western and Eastern Europe, the Middle East and Africa.

Bettcher do Brasil, São Paulo

Supplier of meat trimming and cutting products in Brazil and South America.

Bettcher China, Beijing

Supplier of meat trimming and cutting products in the People's Republic of China and other East Asian countries.

Bettcher Foodservice Division

Manufacturer of automated batter breading machines, breader/sifter tables and electric gyro knives for restaurant kitchens and other foodservice operations.

Whizard Trimmers and AirShirz Scissors, developed by Bettcher Industries, are products used in meat, poultry and seafood processing plants.

Gainco, Inc.

Manufacturer and distributor of weighing, sizing, sorting, distribution and food safety equipment for enhancing yields in meat and food processing plants.

Exsurco Medical

Developer and manufacturer of medical tools for the recovery and processing of cadaveric tissue used for regenerative and reconstructive surgical procedures, including burn and trauma surgeries.

== Patents ==
Bettcher holds patents on numerous equipment designs. A partial listing of patents that are currently in force includes:

Patent #	Date	Title
7670212	1/26/2009	Method of trimming portion of chicken paw metatarsal pad using power operated rotary knife
7798502	6/13/2008	Lug cart and support table assembly for food product breading machine
7650836	7/12/2007	Breading machine
7610864	4/24/2006	Support table assembly for food product breading machine
7107887	6/6/2005	Rotary knife having vacuum attachment
7153202	6/6/2005	Flexible shaft drive transmission
7207114	6/3/2005	Rotary knife with improved drive transmission
7710714	9/13/2004	Housing for scale or load cell controller
7340840	7/30/2004	Blade housing for low-friction rotary knife

== Trademarks ==
Bettcher equipment and products are sold under various trade names registered with the U.S. Patent & Trademark Office. Among the best-known are: AirShirz, Amalgatome, Bettcher Quantum, DuraLite, DuraSift, Edge King, Exsurco, Optimax, TrimVac, and Whizard.
