= George Louis Bettcher =

American Architect (1862–1952)

- Born: 1862; Jersey City, New Jersey, U.S.
- Died: 1952 (aged 89–90)
- Occupation: Architect

George Louis Bettcher (1862–1952) was an American architect based in Denver, Colorado. He designed a number of buildings which survive and are listed on the National Register of Historic Places for their architecture.

== Biography ==
George Louis Bettcher was born in 1862 in Jersey City, New Jersey. He moved to Denver in 1895. He was part of the Unitarian Church. Bettcher was a member of the American Institute of Architects (AIA).

According to the NRHP nomination of the Rossonian Hotel (1912), "he was best known for his residential design work, primarily in the Denver Country Club area." He designed the Stedman Elementary School (1925), which holds cultural significance and was an important school for racial integration efforts in Denver (after Keyes v. School District No. 1).

His work is included in the collections at the Western History and Genealogy Repository at the Denver Public Library.

== Works ==
- Helene Apartment Building (1904), 1052 Pearl Street, Denver, Colorado
- Rossonian Hotel (1912), 2650 Welton Street, Denver, Colorado; NRHP-listed
- Kappler–Cannon–Fieger House (1912), 1904 Kearny Street, Denver, Colorado
- Denver Turnverein (1921), Denver, Colorado; this is Denver's oldest ethnic club building, originally the "Coronado Club"
- Stedman Elementary School (1925), 940 Dexter Street, Denver, Colorado
- Altamaha Apartments, 1490 Lafayette Street, Denver, Colorado; NRHP-listed
- First National Bank of Douglas County (Masonic Hall), 300 Wilcox Street, Castle Rock, Colorado; NRHP-listed
- F. C. Bray House, Denver, Colorado
- The Polyanna House (or Insley House), Leavenworth, Kansas

== See also ==
- National Register of Historic Places listings in downtown Denver
- National Register of Historic Places listings in northeast Denver
