= Louviers (Wilmington, Delaware) =

Historic house in Delaware, United States

- U.S. National Register of Historic Places
- Location within Delaware Location within the United States
- Location: 10 Black Gates Rd., Wilmington, Delaware
- Coordinates: 39°47′8″N 75°34′20″W
- Area: 9.9 acres (4.0 ha)
- Built: 1833
- Architectural style: Greek Revival
- NRHP reference No.: 71000231
- Added to NRHP: December 13, 1971

Louviers, also known as Upper Louviers and Black Gates, was a historic home located at Wilmington in New Castle County, Delaware.

== History ==
The original section was built in 1833 as a two-story stone dwelling measuring 31 feet, 8 inches wide and 35 feet long. Additions were made in 1833, 1837, after 1837, and after 1901. The second addition included a third floor and a facade with a Greek Revival style porch.

From 1837 to 1865, it was the home of Rear Admiral Samuel Francis Du Pont, a member of the prominent Du Pont family. Also located on the property are contributing gate houses, and an iron bridge (1877) that joined Louviers to the powder yards.

It was added to the National Register of Historic Places in 1971. The house has since been demolished, and its site incorporated into the DuPont Country Club. However, the gate houses along Rockland Road and the iron bridge over the Brandywine remain.

== See also ==
- Lower Louviers and Chicken Alley
