= Spring Valley High School =

Spring Valley High School may refer to:

- Springs Valley High School, French Lick, Indiana
- Spring Valley High School (Nevada), Spring Valley, Nevada
- Spring Valley High School (New York), Spring Valley, New York
- Spring Valley High School (South Carolina), Columbia, South Carolina
- Spring Valley High School (West Virginia), Huntington, West Virginia
- Spring Valley High School (Wisconsin), Spring Valley, Wisconsin
