= Spring Valley School (Larkspur, Colorado) =

- U.S. National Register of Historic Places
- Colorado State Register of Historic Properties
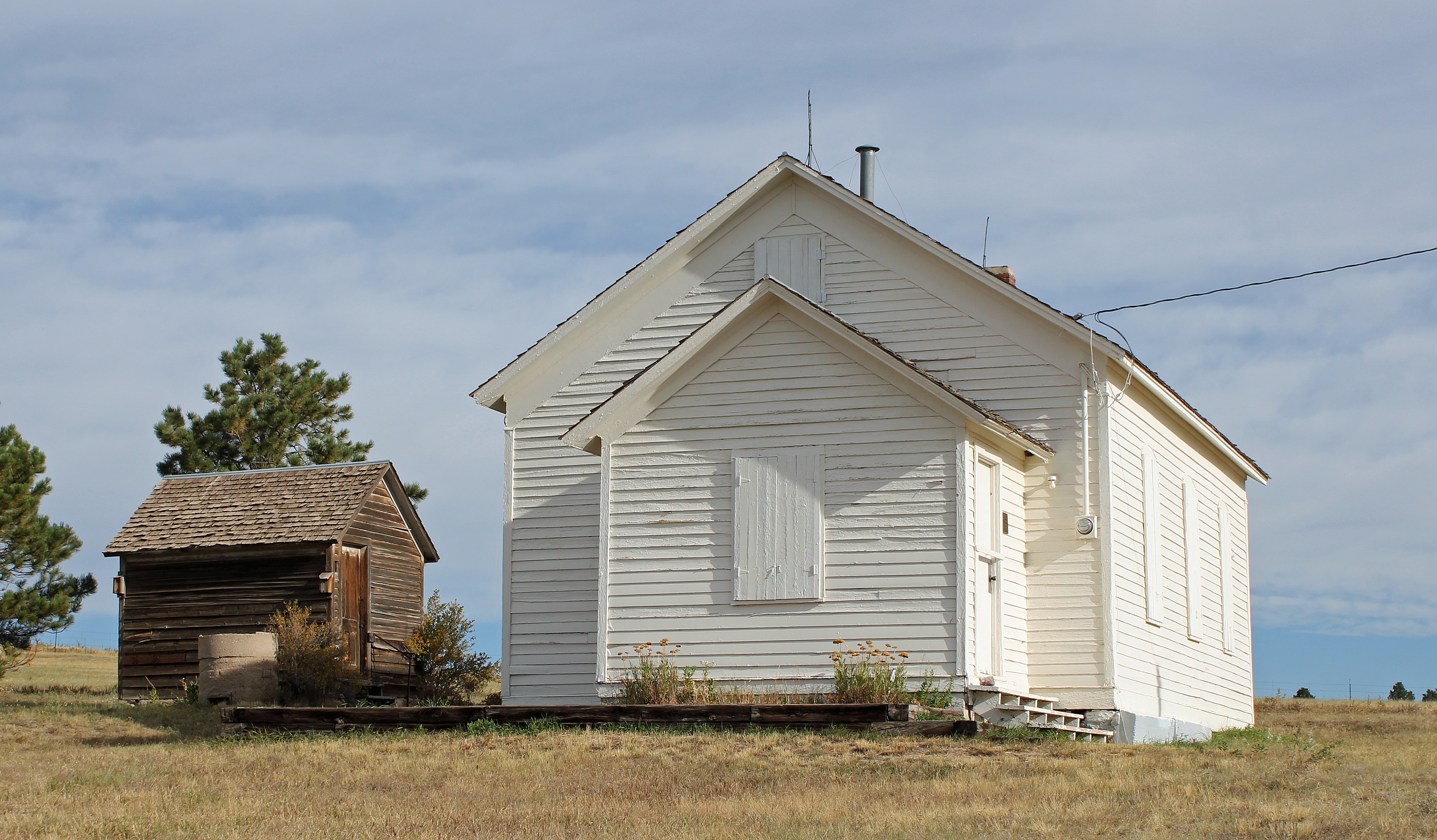

- Location within Colorado Location within the United States
- Nearest city: Larkspur, Colorado
- Coordinates: 39°9′8″N 104°46′10″W
- Area: 1.1 acres (0.45 ha)
- Built: 1874
- Architect: Bucks, Harrison; Geiger, John
- MPS: Rural School Buildings in Colorado MPS
- NRHP reference No.: 78000856
- CSRHP No.: 5DA.219
- Added to NRHP: December 18, 1978

The Spring Valley School near Larkspur, Colorado was built in 1874. It was listed on the National Register of Historic Places in 1978. It has also been known as The School House. The listing included four contributing buildings: the school and three outbuildings.

It was the first of about 100 one-room schoolhouses built in Douglas County. It had a 100-year lease which expired, and ownership transferred from a historical society to another owner.
