= Sedalia, Colorado =

Unincorporated community in Douglas County, CO, USA

- Census-designated place
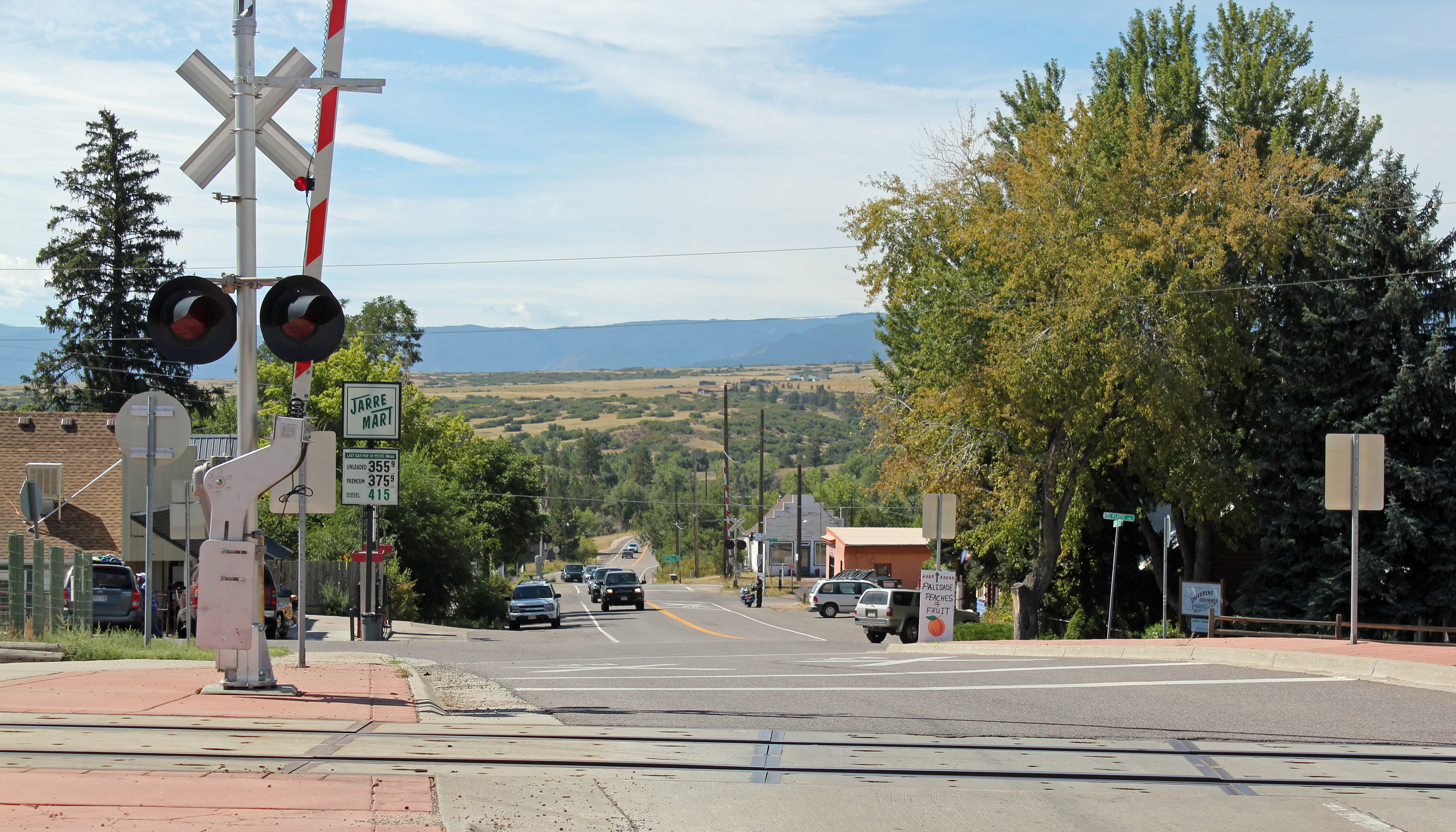
- Looking south on Manhart Street in Sedalia.

- Location of the Sedalia CDP in Douglas County, Colorado
- Coordinates: 39°26′23″N 104°58′12″W
- Country: United States
- State: Colorado
- County: Douglas County

Government
  - Type: unincorporated town

Area
  - Total: 1.363 sq mi (3.531 km^{2})
  - Land: 1.363 sq mi (3.531 km^{2})
- Elevation: 5,824 ft (1,775 m)

Population (2020)
  - Total: 177
  - Density: 130/sq mi (50.1/km^{2})
- Time zone: UTC-7 (MST)
  - Summer (DST): UTC-6 (MDT)
- ZIP Code: 80135
- Area codes: 303 & 720
- GNIS feature ID: 2409301

Sedalia is an unincorporated town, a post office, and a census-designated place (CDP) located in and governed by Douglas County, Colorado, United States. The CDP is a part of the Denver–Aurora–Lakewood, CO Metropolitan Statistical Area. The Sedalia post office has the ZIP Code 80135. At the United States Census 2020, the population of the Sedalia CDP was 177. The median household income in Sedalia is $279,831.

== History ==
The Sedalia post office has been in operation since 1872. The community was named after Sedalia, Missouri.

== Geography ==
Sedalia is located in northern Douglas County along U.S. Route 85, which leads 8 miles (13 km) southeast to Castle Rock, the county seat, and north 24 miles (39 km) to downtown Denver.

The Sedalia CDP has an area of 873 acres (3.531 km^{2}), all land.

== Demographics ==
The United States Census Bureau initially defined the Sedalia CDP for the United States Census 2000.

Sedalia CDP, Colorado
Year	Pop.	±%
2000	211	—
2010	206	−2.4%
2020	177	−14.1%
Source: United States Census Bureau

== Education ==
The Douglas County School District serves Sedalia.

== Notable resident ==
- Philip F. Roach (1881-1976), U.S. Coast Guard Commodore, Navy Cross recipient,

== See also ==
- Denver-Aurora-Boulder, CO Combined Statistical Area
- Denver-Aurora-Broomfield, CO Metropolitan Statistical Area
- Denver and Rio Grande Western Railroad
