= Mrs. Colorado =

Pageant

- Formation: 1939
- Type: Pageant
- Members: Mrs. America
- Website: Official website

The Mrs. Colorado competition is the pageant that selects the representative for the state of Colorado in the Mrs. America pageant. The event was held in Arvada from 1992 to 1998 (1995-1998 titles) and moved to Denver in 1999. The Pageant has been held in the Ellie Caulkins Opera House in the Denver Performing Arts Complex.

From 1990 to 2008, the Mrs. Colorado state pageant was directed by Tricia Dampier, based in Littleton, Colorado. In 2008, it was taken over by Abundance Productions, based in Parker, Colorado. Abundance Productions is owned and operated by Emily Stark. Colorado has been one of the consistent successful states at Mrs. America, having one Mrs. America (Mrs. America 2006 Marney Andes after Diane Hardgrove was crowned Mrs. World, Marney became Mrs. America), one first runner-up, two 2nd Runner up and one Top 6 and eight Top 10 placements.

== Results summary ==
The following is a visual summary of the past results of Mrs. Colorado titleholders at the national Mrs. America pageants/competitions. The year in parentheses indicates the year of the national competition during which a placement and/or award was garnered, not the year attached to the contestant's state title.

=== Placements ===
- Mrs. America following 1st Runner-up placement Marney Andes (2006)
- 1st runner-up : Debi Barnhill (1993), Marney Andes (2006)
- 2nd runner-up: Connie LeLaCheur (1988), Janell Ames (2011)
- Top 6: Shalon Polson (2010)
- Top 10: Paula Aurand (1995), Shae Stuard (1999), Raeanne Smith (2000), Emily Stark (2002), Megan Yarberry (2009), Nicki Myers (2014), Mette Castor (2015), Valerie Daly (2017), Nicole Covney (2020), Sylvia Waller (2022)
- Top 12: Blair Wellman (1991)

Colorado holds a record of sixteen placements at Mrs. America.

=== Awards ===
- Best Costume: Raeanne Smith (2000), Danette Haag (2021), Corrie Francis- American Title (2021), Sunika Varner (2025)
- Mrs. Photogenic: Debbie Barnhill (1993), Lauren Campbell (2018)
- Best Scrapbook: Gina Mulholland (1998), Debi Moore (1994)
- Most Outstanding Ad Page: Gina Mulholland (1998) Sunika Varner (2025)
- Publication: Erica Shields (2016)

== Winners ==
Year	Name	Age	City	Awards	Notes
1949					Held at Elitches Gardens
1954	Patricia Ann Ford				
1956	Adeline Morris			Top 3	
1957	Laura Hollar		Rocky Ford		
1958	Margie Yost		Greeley		
1959					
1960	Jo Ann Paustain		Littleton		
1961	Cayolyn Wagner				
1962	Lillian Helling				
1963	Francine (Jane) Alverson		Denver		
1964					
1965	Margaret Freeman		Denver		1st Runner Up to Mrs. America 1965
1966	Joan Mendez				
1967	Jeanne E Graves		Pueblo West		
1968					
1969	Doris Jean Scott				
1977	Barbara Wannamaker		Denver		
1979	Carol Viano		Loveland		
1980	Maryann Roedel				
1981	Sharon Nuanes		Golden		
1982					
1983	Linda Krause				
1984	Sandra Wedemeyer				
1985	Colleen Adolfson		Colorado Springs		
1986	Laurie Kole Wallace		Centennial		
1987	Rebecca Sein				
1988	Connie Lelacheur				
1989	Tricia Dampier		Littleton		
1990	Toni Cole		Castle Rock		
1991	Blair Morgan		Blackhawk		Active duty military
1993	Debbie Barnhill		Arvada	1st Runner-up	
1994	Debi Moore		Loveland		National Scrapbook Award
1995	Paula Stephens		Littleton	Top 10	
1996	Amy Nugent		Lone Tree		
1997	Diandre Warren		Denver		
1998	Gina Mulholland		Denver		
1999	Shae Stuard		Castle Pines	Top 10	
2000	Raeanne Smith		Northglenn	Top 10 & Best Costume	Miss Colorado Teen 1982
2001	Traci Tattersall		Parker		
2002	Emily Stark		Parker	Top 10	Miss Colorado USA 1995
2003	Elisabeth Cartmill	20	Aurora		Youngest Mrs. CO crowned - turned 21 during her year
2004	Sheri Engstrom		Fort Collins		
2005	Jennifer Lamont		Denver		
2006	Marney Andes		Aurora	Mrs. America 2006	Miss Nebraska Teen USA 1992
2007	Tiffany Haugen		Colorado Springs		
2008	Christina Sacha		Denver		Young American Miss International 1992 and Little Miss America 1982 along with Top 6 at Miss Illinois USA
2009	Megan McCarter		Cañon City	Top 10	Blossom Queen 1999
2010	Shalon Polson		Highlands Ranch	Top 6	Miss Colorado Teen 1990, 1st Colorado Teen to make Top 10
2011	Janell Ames		Franktown	2nd Runner-up	
2012	Courtney Graham		Castle Rock		
2013	Mina Muirhead		Ft. Collins		
2014	Nicki Myers	29	Denver	Top 10	
2015	Mette Castor		Highlands Ranch	Top 10	Miss Louisiana America 1997
2016	Erica Shields		Littleton	Publication Award	
2017	Valerie Daly		Monument	Top 10	
2018	Lauren Campbell		Denver	Mrs. Photogenic	Miss Colorado USA 2005
2019	Rachael Preslar		Aurora		Active duty military
2020	Nicole Covney		Highlands Ranch	Top 12	Most Whimsical Costume
2020A*	Sylvia Waller	58	Aurora	Top 10	Best in Physical Fitness
2021	Danette Haag		Windsor		Best Costume
2021A*	Corrie Francis		Arvada		Mrs. Arizona 2010
2022	Sylvia Waller	60	Aurora	Top 12	
2022A	Nikki Goss		Monument	Top 12	
2023	Dani Holliday		Aurora		National Costume is housed at Denver History Museum - Chili Pepper
2023A	Natalie Oliver-Atherton	61	Centennial		
2024	Bethany Norman		Timnath		
2024A	Christina Joymon		Cherry Hills		1st Runner Up to Mrs. American
2025	Sunika Varner		Sadalia		Best Costume
2025A	Kendall Berg		Monument	Top 15	
