= Ridgeline (disambiguation) =

A ridgeline is the crest of a ridge. It may also refer to:

- Honda Ridgeline, a sport utility truck
- Ridgeline Open Space, a public park in Castle Rock, Colorado, United States
- Ridgeline High School (Utah), a public high school in Millville, Utah
- Ridgeline High School (Washington), a public high school in Liberty Lake, Washington
- Ridgeline Middle School, a school in the Yelm School District, Washington, United States
