= The Meadows, Castle Rock, Colorado =

Community in Colorado, United States

Coordinates: 39°24′N 104°54′W

The Meadows at Historic Castle Rock

The Meadows is a master planned community, located in Castle Rock, Colorado along the Rampart Range of the Rocky Mountains Front Range. It is approximately 24 miles (39 km) south of Denver and 41 miles (66 km) north of Colorado Springs. The community is interconnected by 24 miles (39 km) of trails and contains 1,100 acres (4.5 km^{2}) of parks and land for public use. Within the community, there are several schools, churches, playgrounds, ball fields, pools, restaurants and a cultural arts center.

== Education ==
There are several schools located within The Meadows.

=== Elementary schools (K-6) ===
- Clear Sky Elementary School
- Meadow View Elementary School
- Soaring Hawk Elementary School

=== Middle school (7-8) ===
- Castle Rock Middle School

=== High school (9-12) ===
- Castle View High School
- Colorado Early Colleges Castle Rock

=== Charter schools (K-8) ===
- Academy Charter School
- Aspen View Academy

=== Other ===
- Arapahoe Community College Sturm Campus

== Neighborhoods ==
The Meadows is currently made up of thirty neighborhoods:

- Briscoe Ranch
- Feathergrass
- Fuller Bluff
- Harris Grove
- Morgans Run
- Morningview
- Patina
- Plainsong
- Suncatcher
- Sweetwood
- Watercolor
- Weathervane
- Meadow Gate
- Mountain View
- Coyote Run
- Vista Heights
- Aspen Trail
- Deer Track
- Blacktail
- Azure
- Stewart Park
- Soaring Eagle Estates
- Upland Park
- Alpine Ridge
- Gamble Oak
- High Prairie
- Leafdale
- New Haven
- Tyler Park
- Cyan Circle

== Parks and recreation ==
There are many parks, open spaces, and recreational areas within The Meadows.

=== Trails and Open Spaces ===
- East Plum Creek Trail
- Native Legend Open Space
- Ridgeline Open Space
- Watercolor Bike Jumps

=== Pools ===
- The Grange Cultural Arts Center
- Taft House

=== Playgrounds and Parks ===
- Bison Park
- Butterfield Crossing Park
- Paintbrush Park
- Wiggly Field Dog Park
- Green Park
- Deputy Zack S. Parrish III Memorial Park
- Suncatcher Park
