= Castle Rock Depot =

- U.S. National Register of Historic Places
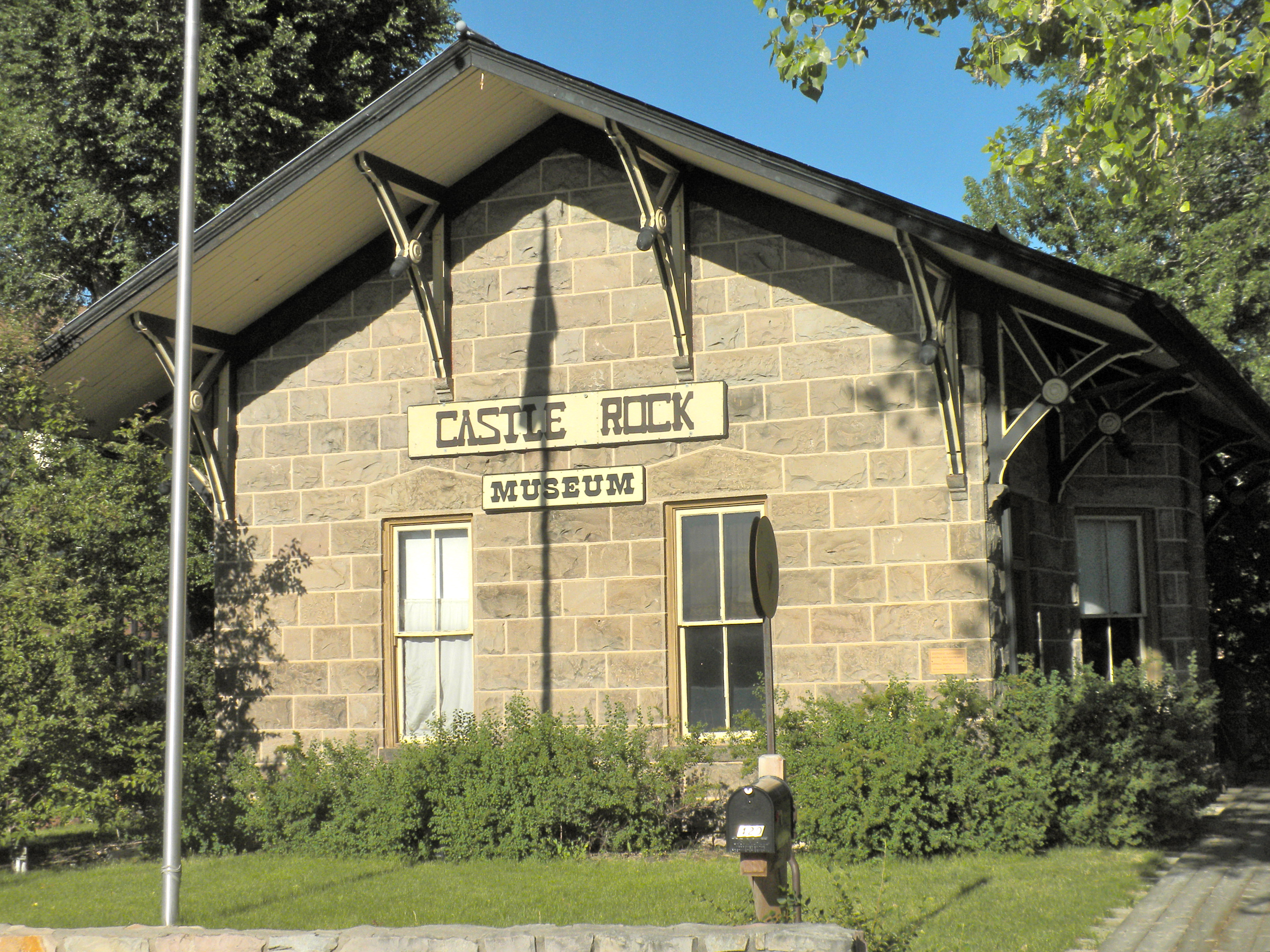
- Depot building in 2010

- Location within Colorado
- Location: 420 Elbert St., Castle Rock, Colorado
- Coordinates: 39.37407°N 104.86235°W
- Area: 1 acre (0.40 ha)
- Built: 1875
- Built by: Hammar, Benjamin
- Architectural style: Late Victorian
- NRHP reference No.: 74000575
- Added to NRHP: October 11, 1974

The Castle Rock Depot is a historic Denver & Rio Grande Railway train station, now the Castle Rock Museum and located at 420 Elbert Street in Castle Rock, Colorado.

== History ==
The depot was built in 1875; it was moved in 1970 a few blocks from its original location. It was listed on the National Register of Historic Places in 1974.

It was built by Benjamin Hammar (interred in the Castle Rock cemetery), who also built the original Denver Union Terminal in downtown Denver.

The museum includes original ink and watercolor architectural drawings by the unknown architect of the building.

It has elements of Victorian style and was built of rhyolite stone from Castle Rock quarries. It is "one of Colorado's older original buildings". It is a "rare example of a stone depot constructed by the Denver & Rio Grande Railroad."

It is a one-and-a-half-story building, 24 by 40 feet (7.3 m × 12.2 m) in plan.

| Preceding station | Denver and Rio Grande Western Railroad | Following station |
|---|---|---|
| Larkspur toward Ogden | Royal Gorge Route | Sedalia toward Denver |
