= Castle Rock, Colorado =

Home-rule town in Douglas County, Colorado, USA

- Home rule town
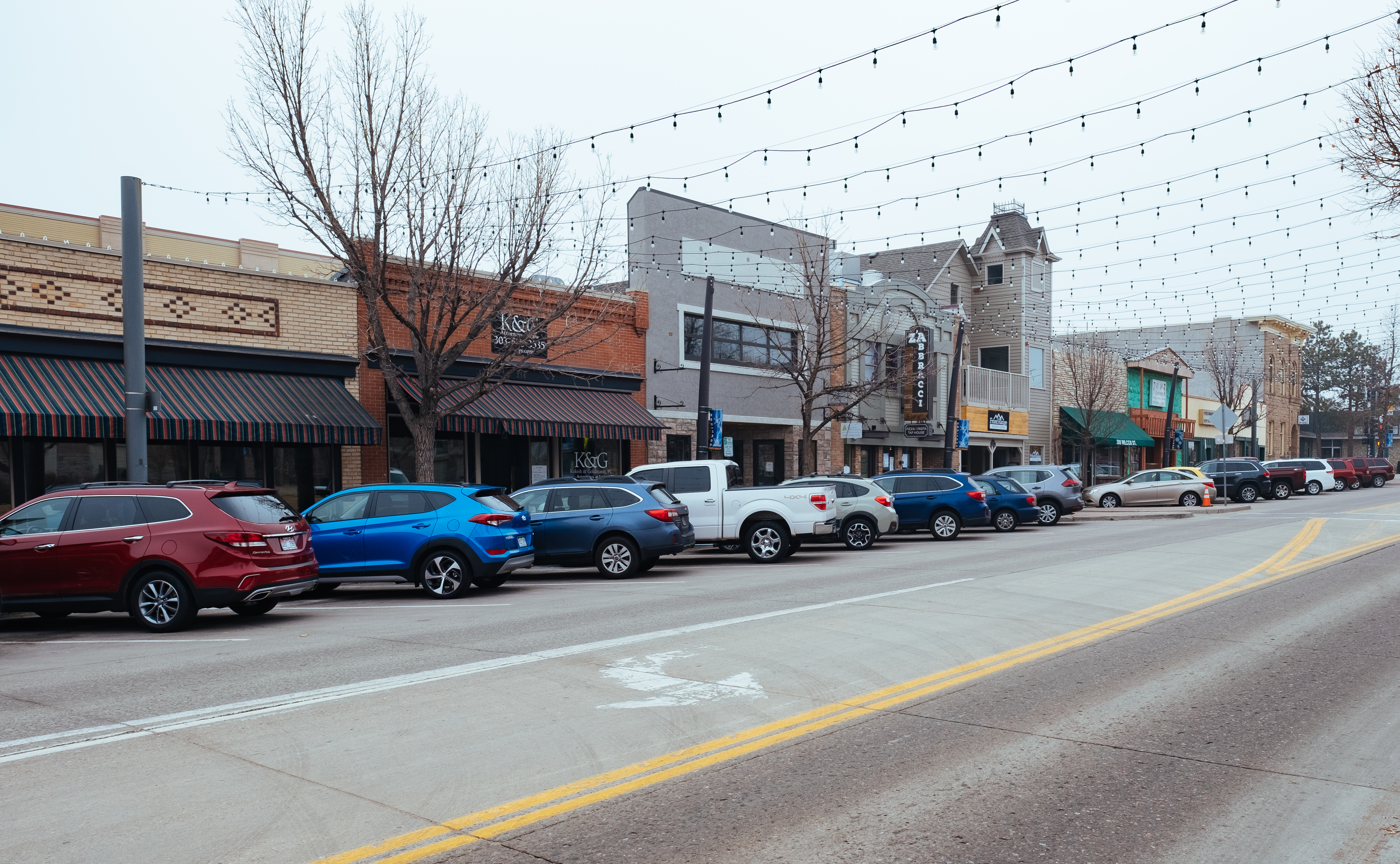
- Looking down Wilcox Street (2018)

- Location within Douglas County and Colorado

- Location of Castle Rock Castle Rock (Colorado)
- Coordinates: 39°22′20″N 104°52′30″W
- Country: United States
- State: Colorado
- County: Douglas
- Founded: 1874
- Incorporated: April 14, 1881

Government
  - Type: Home rule town

Area
  - Total: 34.742 sq mi (89.981 km^{2})
  - Land: 34.742 sq mi (89.981 km^{2})
  - Water: 0 sq mi (0.000 km^{2})
- Elevation: 6,224 ft (1,897 m)

Population (2020)
  - Total: 73,158
  - Density: 2,308.2/sq mi (891.19/km^{2})
- Time zone: UTC−07:00 (MST)
  - Summer (DST): UTC−06:00 (MDT)
- ZIP code: 80104, 80108, 80109
- Area codes: 303/720/983
- GNIS town ID: 2413179
- FIPS code: 08-12415
- Website: crgov.com

Castle Rock is a home rule town that is the county seat of and the most-populous municipality in Douglas County, Colorado, United States. The town's population was 73,158 at the 2020 census, a 51.68% increase since the 2010 census. Castle Rock is the most-populous Colorado town (rather than city) and the 14th-most populous Colorado municipality. Castle Rock is a part of the Denver-Aurora-Lakewood, CO metropolitan statistical area and the Front Range urban corridor.

The town is named for the prominent, castle-shaped butte near the center of town.

== History ==
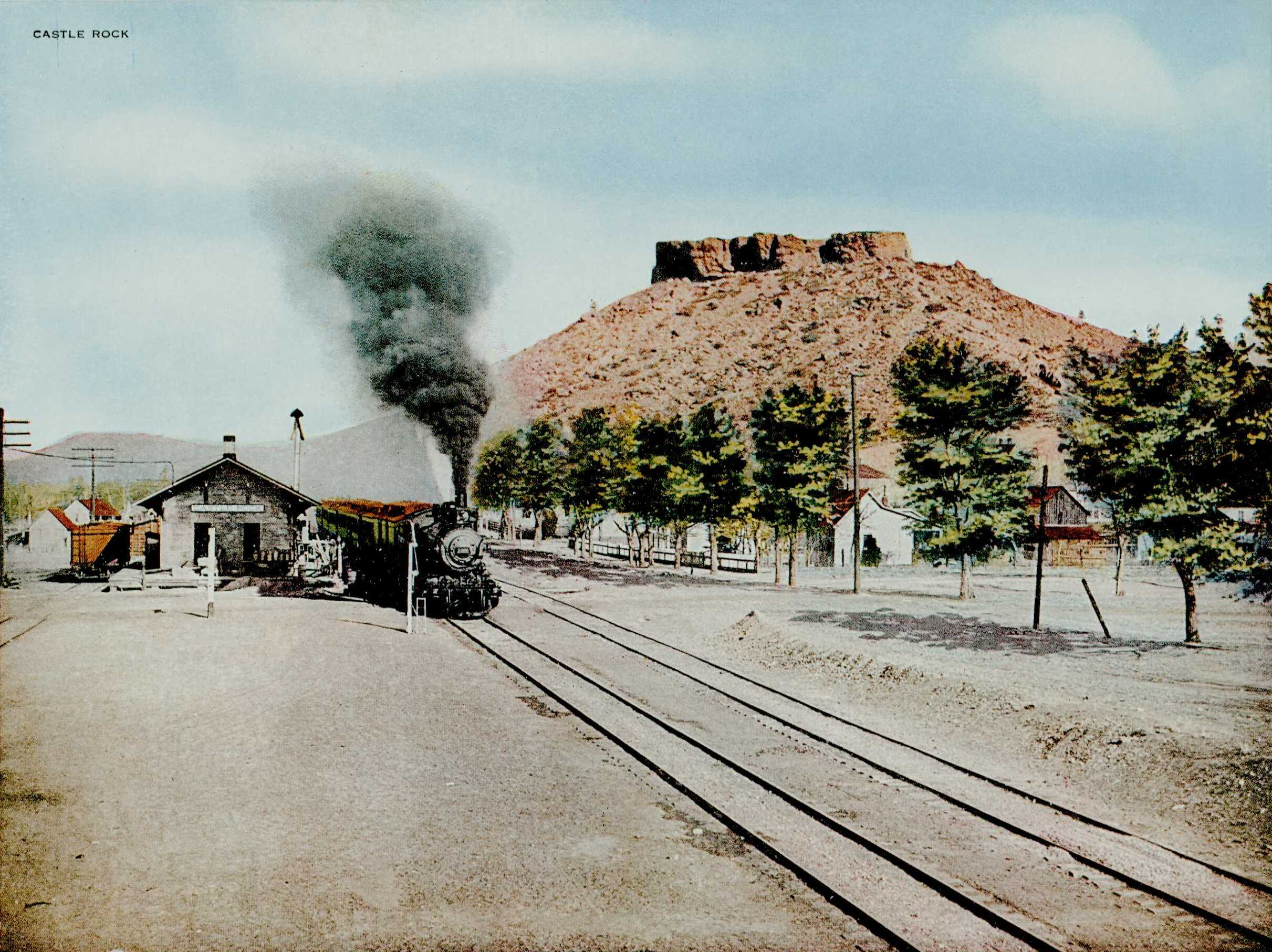
The Denver and Rio Grande Railway's Castle Rock depot (1917)

White settlers were drawn to the area by rumors of gold and by land opened through the Homestead Act of 1862. The discovery of rhyolite stone, though, not gold, ultimately led to the settlement of Castle Rock.

Castle Rock was founded in 1874 when the eastern Douglas County border was redrawn to its present location. Castle Rock was chosen as the county seat because of its central location.

One of the first homesteaders in the area near today's Castle Rock was Jeremiah Gould. He owned about 160 acres (0.65 km^{2}) to the south of "the (Castle) Rock". At that time, the settlement consisted of just a few buildings for prospectors, workers, and cowboys. In 1874, Gould donated 120 acres (0.49 km^{2}) to the new town, which was also now home to the Douglas County government. Six streets named Elbert, Jerry, Wilcox, Perry, Castle, and Front were laid out to build the actual town of Castle Rock. The courthouse square was defined and about 77 lots, each 50 by 112 ft (15 by 34 m), were auctioned off for a total profit of US$3,400.

A new train depot brought the Denver and Rio Grande Railway to the area.

During the late 1800s and early 1900s, Castle Rock had a very active rhyolite-quarrying industry. Many immigrants arrived in the area to work in the quarries.

In 1936, the town received a donation of land that included its namesake geographical feature. Men employed by the Works Progress Administration constructed a star atop the butte shortly after Castle Rock received that donation. The star was lit every year from 1936 to 1941. After World War II began, the star was left unlit as a symbol of sacrifice in support of the war effort. On August 14, 1945, shortly after V-J Day, the star was modified into a V-for-victory symbol. On December 7, 1945, the star was lit for the holiday season. It has been lit every year since around the same time.

The town's historic county courthouse, which was built in 1889–1890, burned down on March 11, 1978, the result of arson.

Castle Rock's municipal government experienced significant financial difficulties during the early 1980s. In 1984, the town's voters approved a charter amendment that authorized the creation of a home-rule charter commission. The home-rule charter was finalized in 1987.

The original Douglas County courthouse was one of seven buildings in Castle Rock that have been added to the National Register of Historic Places. The other buildings include Castle Rock Depot, Castle Rock Elementary School, First National Bank of Douglas County, Samuel Dyer House, Benjamin Hammer House, and Keystone Hotel.

A dispute about whether the Castle Rock Police Department was required to enforce a civil restraining order was decided by the U.S. Supreme Court in 2005. The court held, in Town of Castle Rock v. Gonzales, that a municipality cannot be held liable under a federal civil-rights statute, 42 U.S.C. § 1983, for failing to enforce civil restraining orders. The case had arisen from a 1999 murder of three young girls by their father outside the Castle Rock Police Department building. The children were killed by their father, in violation of the restraining order that had been obtained by their mother, within several hours of being abducted. The mother had asked the Castle Rock police to enforce the restraining order by finding and apprehending the father after he removed the children from her home and before the murders. Castle Rock police officers declined to do so, refusing even to contact the Denver Police Department after the mother notified them that the father had taken the children to an amusement park in that city.

== Geography ==
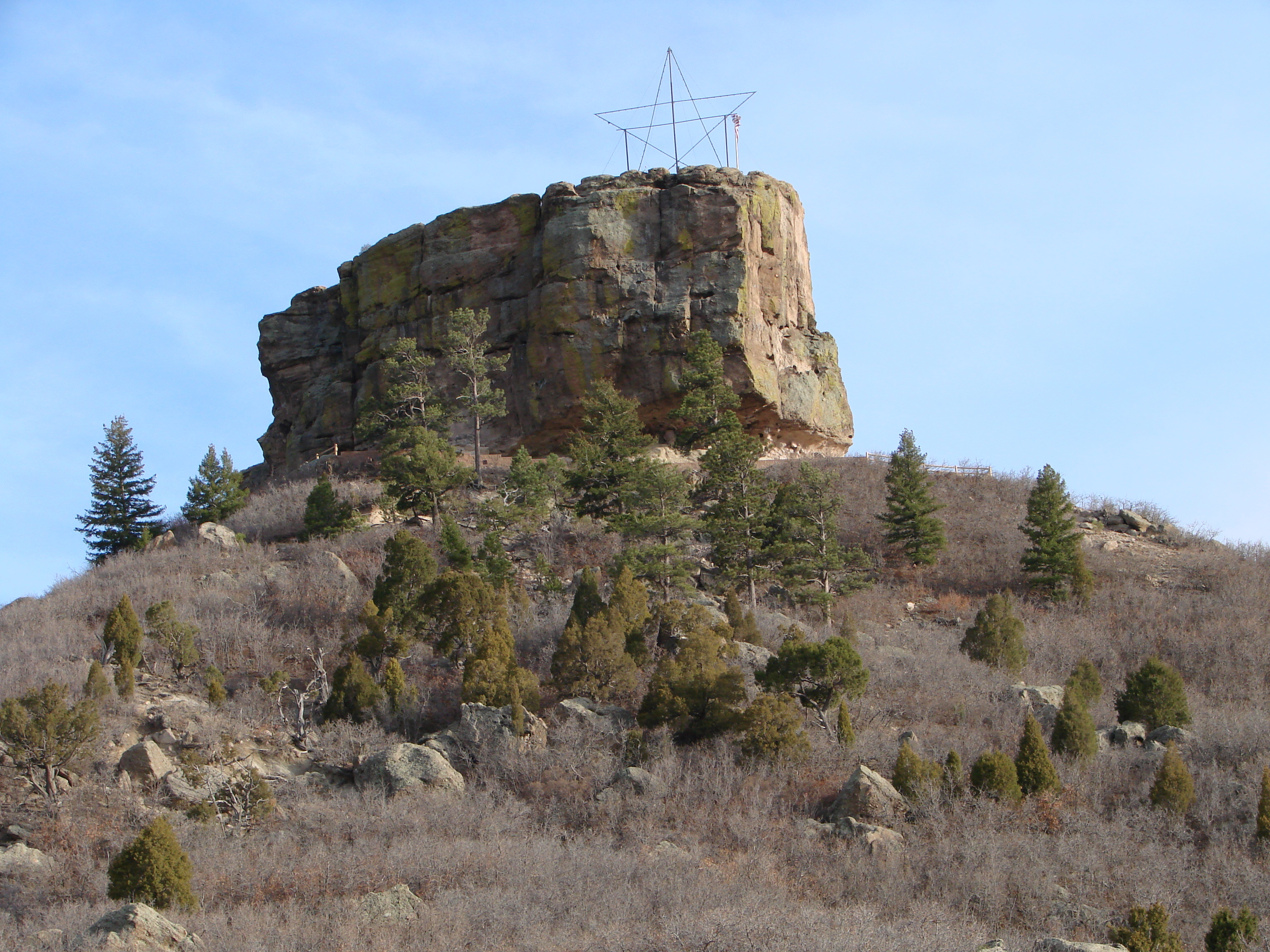
The town of Castle Rock is named after this prominent castle tower-shaped butte.

Castle Rock is located in central Colorado at the junction of Interstate 25 and State Highway 86, 28 mi (45 km) south of downtown Denver and 37 mi (60 km) north of Colorado Springs.

The town lies a few miles east of the Rampart Range of the Rocky Mountains on the western edge of the Great Plains. Castle Rock, the butte for which the town is named, is just north of the town center. Other prominent landforms visible from Castle Rock include Dawson Butte, Devils Head, Mount Blue Sky, and Pikes Peak.

East Plum Creek, a stream within the South Platte River watershed, flows generally north through Castle Rock. Hangman's Gulch, which runs northwest then west around the north side of the town center, drains into East Plum Creek, as do multiple unnamed gulches in the southern and western areas of town. McMurdo Gulch and Mitchell Gulch run north then northeast through eastern Castle Rock and drain into Cherry Creek east of town.

Castle Rock is in the Colorado Foothills life zone. The hillsides are covered with meadows of grass, small plants, scattered juniper trees, and open ponderosa pine woodlands. Other trees common in the area include Gambel oak (scrub oak or oak brush) and pinyon pine. Local wildlife includes the American badger, American black bear, bobcat, coyote, Colorado chipmunk, crow, garter snakes, gray fox, mountain cottontail rabbit, mountain lion, mule deer, pocket gopher, porcupine, skunk, and tadpoles. Birds found in the area include the golden eagle, peregrine falcon, sharp-shinned hawk, black-billed magpie, red-tailed hawk, pinyon jay, and western tanager.

The town had a total area of 22,235 acres (89.981 km^{2}), all land in 2023.

Lying within the Front Range urban corridor, the town is part of the greater Denver metropolitan area. Castle Rock borders three communities, all to its north; from west to east, they are Castle Pines Village, the city of Castle Pines, and The Pinery. Other nearby communities include Franktown to the east, Larkspur to the south, Perry Park to the southwest, and Sedalia to the northwest.

=== Climate ===
Castle Rock has a semiarid climate (Köppen BSk) with cold, dry, snowy winters, and hot, wetter summers. January is the coldest month, July the hottest, and August the month with the most precipitation.

Climate data for Castle Rock, Colorado, 1991–2020 normals, extremes 1893–present
Month	Jan	Feb	Mar	Apr	May	Jun	Jul	Aug	Sep	Oct	Nov	Dec	Year
Record high °F (°C)	73 (23)	75 (24)	82 (28)	91 (33)	94 (34)	101 (38)	102 (39)	99 (37)	101 (38)	88 (31)	85 (29)	82 (28)	102 (39)
Mean maximum °F (°C)	64.5 (18.1)	64.6 (18.1)	72.8 (22.7)	77.7 (25.4)	84.9 (29.4)	92.7 (33.7)	95.3 (35.2)	92.8 (33.8)	89.6 (32.0)	82.1 (27.8)	72.8 (22.7)	65.3 (18.5)	96.1 (35.6)
Mean daily maximum °F (°C)	45.6 (7.6)	46.7 (8.2)	53.8 (12.1)	59.1 (15.1)	68.4 (20.2)	80.2 (26.8)	85.7 (29.8)	83.6 (28.7)	76.7 (24.8)	64.8 (18.2)	53.9 (12.2)	45.7 (7.6)	63.7 (17.6)
Daily mean °F (°C)	31.8 (−0.1)	33.3 (0.7)	40.2 (4.6)	45.8 (7.7)	55.0 (12.8)	65.3 (18.5)	71.1 (21.7)	69.1 (20.6)	61.7 (16.5)	49.7 (9.8)	39.8 (4.3)	31.8 (−0.1)	49.5 (9.8)
Mean daily minimum °F (°C)	18.0 (−7.8)	19.9 (−6.7)	26.5 (−3.1)	32.5 (0.3)	41.6 (5.3)	50.5 (10.3)	56.4 (13.6)	54.7 (12.6)	46.6 (8.1)	34.6 (1.4)	25.7 (−3.5)	18.0 (−7.8)	35.4 (1.9)
Mean minimum °F (°C)	−4.0 (−20.0)	−3.4 (−19.7)	6.6 (−14.1)	15.7 (−9.1)	27.2 (−2.7)	38.5 (3.6)	48.2 (9.0)	45.6 (7.6)	32.1 (0.1)	16.7 (−8.5)	3.6 (−15.8)	−3.0 (−19.4)	−9.5 (−23.1)
Record low °F (°C)	−37 (−38)	−32 (−36)	−20 (−29)	−8 (−22)	7 (−14)	25 (−4)	30 (−1)	34 (1)	11 (−12)	−5 (−21)	−18 (−28)	−29 (−34)	−37 (−38)
Average precipitation inches (mm)	0.55 (14)	0.70 (18)	1.54 (39)	2.08 (53)	1.97 (50)	2.20 (56)	2.32 (59)	2.52 (64)	1.39 (35)	0.85 (22)	0.79 (20)	0.69 (18)	17.60 (447)
Average snowfall inches (cm)	8.0 (20)	10.7 (27)	10.7 (27)	8.3 (21)	1.1 (2.8)	0.0 (0.0)	0.0 (0.0)	0.0 (0.0)	0.4 (1.0)	2.7 (6.9)	6.7 (17)	8.9 (23)	57.5 (145.7)
Average precipitation days (≥ 0.01 in)	4.1	4.9	5.0	6.4	8.3	7.7	8.3	10.1	5.8	4.4	4.1	4.6	73.7
Average snowy days (≥ 0.1 in)	3.6	4.1	3.3	3.1	0.6	0.0	0.0	0.0	0.3	1.0	2.7	4.3	23.0
Source 1: NOAA
Source 2: National Weather Service

Statewide, Colorado has experienced an average temperature increase of about 2.5 °F (1.4 °C) over the past half-century. Given its location in the center of the state, Castle Rock is expected to experience continuing warming and higher average temperatures through the 21st century, as the effects of climate change continue to be felt. Daily minimum temperatures are also expected to continue rising, as they have for the past 30 years.

=== Neighborhoods ===
Castle Rock's ZIP codes include many neighborhoods:

North of Downtown / West of I-25

- The Meadows
- Castle Pines Village

Castle Rock encompasses about 35 square miles (91 km^{2}), with a population of more than 73,000.

== Demographics ==
Historical population
Census	Pop.	Note	%±
1880	88		—
1890	315		258.0%
1900	304		−3.5%
1910	365		20.1%
1920	461		26.3%
1930	478		3.7%
1940	580		21.3%
1950	741		27.8%
1960	1,152		55.5%
1970	1,531		32.9%
1980	3,921		156.1%
1990	8,708		122.1%
2000	20,224		132.2%
2010	48,231		138.5%
2020	73,158		51.7%
2025 (est.)	83,815	▲	14.6%
U.S. Decennial Census; 2020 Census

=== 2020 census ===
As of the 2020 census, Castle Rock had a population of 73,158. The median age was 36.3 years. 28.1% of residents were under the age of 18 and 10.8% were 65 years of age or older. For every 100 females, there were 99.8 males, and for every 100 females age 18 and over, there were 96.7 males age 18 and over.

98.4% of residents lived in urban areas, while 1.6% lived in rural areas.

There were 25,405 households in Castle Rock, of which 42.5% had children under the age of 18 living in them. Of all households, 64.5% were married-couple households, 12.5% were households with a male householder and no spouse or partner present, and 17.6% were households with a female householder and no spouse or partner present. About 17.5% of all households were made up of individuals and 6.2% had someone living alone who was 65 years of age or older.

There were 26,620 housing units, of which 4.6% were vacant. The homeowner vacancy rate was 1.1% and the rental vacancy rate was 9.4%.

Racial composition as of the 2020 census
Race	Number	Percent
White	60,236	82.3%
Black or African American	1,067	1.5%
American Indian and Alaska Native	423	0.6%
Asian	1,635	2.2%
Native Hawaiian and Other Pacific Islander	89	0.1%
Some other race	2,056	2.8%
Two or more races	7,652	10.5%
Hispanic or Latino (of any race)	8,536	11.7%

=== 2010 census ===
As of the 2010 census, 48,231 people, 16,688 households, and 12,974 families were residing in the town. The population density was 1,526.3 inhabitants per square mile (589.3/km^{2}). The 17,626 housing units had an average density of 557.8 per square mile (215.4/km^{2}). The racial makeup of the town was 90.7% White, 1.7% Asian, 1.1% African American, 0.6% American Indian, 0.1% Pacific Islander, 2.9% from other races, and 2.8% from two or more races. Hispanics and Latinos of any race were 10.0% of the population.

Of the 16,688 households, 48.4% had children under 18 living with them, 65.4% were married couples living together, 3.9% had a male householder with no wife present, 8.5% had a female householder with no husband present, and 22.3% were not families. About 17.7% of all households were made up of individuals, and 4.0% had someone living alone who was 65 or older. The average household size was 2.86, and the average family size was 3.27.

In the town, the age distribution was 32.4% under 18, 5.8% from 18 to 24, 33.0% from 25 to 44, 22.6% from 45 to 64, and 6.2% who were 65 or older. The median age was 33.8 years. For every 100 females, there were 98.5 males. For every 100 females 18 and over, there were 95.5 males 18 and over.

The median income for a household in the town was $85,461, and for a family was $95,973. Males had a median income of $66,993 versus $47,087 for females. The per capita income for the town was $34,089. About 4.0% of families and 6.2% of the population were below the poverty line, including 8.2% of those under 18 and 6.2% of those 65 or over.

Castle Rock is the 14th-most populous municipality in Colorado and is the center of the burgeoning urbanization of the county.

== Economy ==
Because of its Front Range location between Denver and its inner suburbs and Colorado Springs, many of Castle Rock's residents commute nearly 40 miles to southern Colorado Springs on I-25 or the Denver Technological Center, better known as the Denver Tech Center, which is an 18-mile drive north, with downtown Denver roughly 30 miles north, and Denver International Airport about 45 miles north.

About 80% of Castle Rock residents commute out of town to work. The mean travel time to work for a Castle Rock resident is 28.6 minutes, longer than the U.S. average. One reason for this is that the town has not yet attracted the variety or extent of employers needed to significantly lower the number of commuters to work outside Castle Rock. The town has relatively little land zoned for industrial or light industrial use, with the vast majority of the land within town limits dedicated to residential construction only.

As of the 2019–2023 American Community Survey estimates, 74.5% of the population over the age of 16 was in the civilian labor force, 0.4% was in the armed forces, with 70.8% employed and 4.5% unemployed. The employed civilian labor force was 55.2% in management, business, science, and arts; 20.3% in sales and office occupations; 14.2% in service occupations; 4.1% in natural resources, construction, and maintenance; and 6.3% in production, transportation, and material moving. The three industries employing the largest proportion of the working civilian labor force were educational services, health care, and social assistance (16.1%); professional, scientific, management, and administrative and waste management services (10.3%); and finance and insurance, and real estate and rental and leasing (9.7%). The median household income was $145,197 and the per capita income was $62,170. About 3.8% of the population was below the poverty line.

Castle Rock's cost of living is above average. The town's median household income of $145,197 is nearly double the national median, reflecting both the higher cost of living and the professional workforce typical of the Denver metropolitan area.

As of the 2020–2024 American Community Survey estimates, the median value of owner-occupied housing units in Castle Rock was $652,900. The median gross monthly rent was $2,000.

Residential building permit issuance has fluctuated significantly with market conditions. After peaking at 1,169 single-family permits in 2021, the town issued approximately 685 residential permits in 2023 and saw a further decline in 2024, with 371 residential permits issued through October of that year.

== Government and politics ==
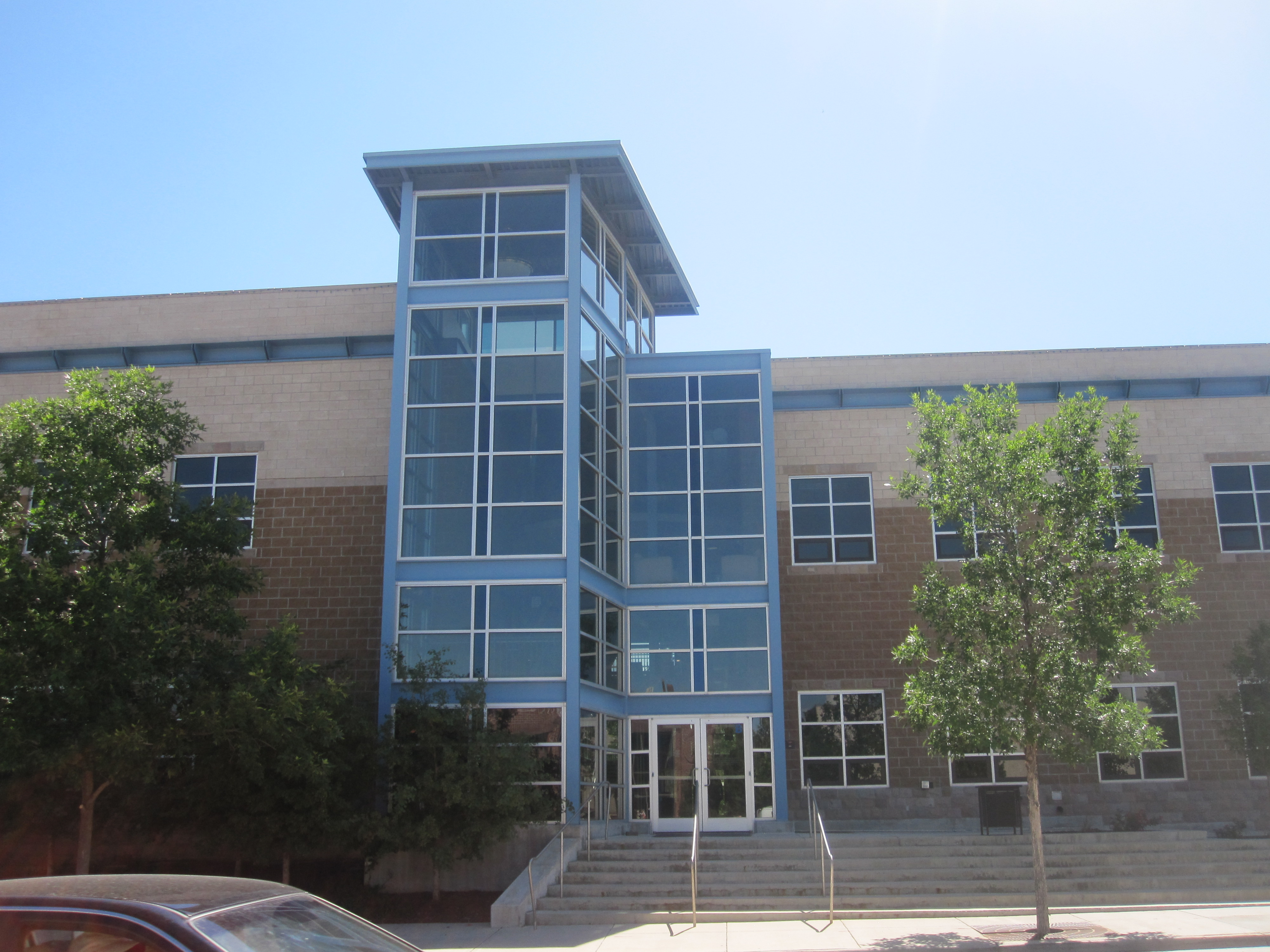
Castle Rock Town Hall (2010)

Castle Rock is a home-rule municipality with a council–manager form of government. The town's governing body is the town council, made up of seven members including the mayor and mayor pro-tem. Each councilmember is elected to represent an election district, and the mayor is elected to represent the town at large. One member, appointed by the council, serves as the mayor pro-tem. Castle Rock voters approved a change to the town charter that authorized an at-large mayor in 2017.

The mayor presides over council meetings and casts one vote, like other councilmembers. The council sets policy for the town, adopts ordinances, approves the town budget, makes major land-use decisions, and appoints key town government staff, including the town manager, town attorney, municipal judge, and members of town boards and commissions.

The town manager supervises all departments, prepares and implements the town budget, and works with the council to develop policies and propose new plans.

Tax revenues are used to provide general government, fire, police, parks maintenance and programs, street maintenance and operations, support for recreation, and planning and code enforcement services. The town also provides development services, golf, water, and sewer services to residents through self-supporting enterprise funds. The average annual municipal property tax bill of a Castle Rock resident is $40.66. That is in addition to property taxes assessed by Douglas County and other entities.

As the county seat, Castle Rock is the administrative center of Douglas County. The county courthouse, the Douglas County Justice Center, is north of downtown, and most departments of the county government base their operations in the town.

Castle Rock lies within Colorado's 4th U.S. Congressional District. The town is in the 2nd district of the Colorado Senate and the 45th district of the Colorado House of Representatives.

Castle Rock is the county seat of Douglas County, a Republican stronghold in Colorado.

== Education ==
=== Primary and secondary education ===
Douglas County School District, based in Castle Rock, operates 18 public schools in the town. These include 10 elementary schools, two middle schools, two charter schools, one magnet school, one alternative high school, and two high schools: Castle View High School and Douglas County High School. In addition, there are three private primary schools in Castle Rock.

School-board elections in Douglas County are held in odd-numbered years. In recent years, the community has experienced a spirited debate between supporters of significant change in the management of local schools and those who oppose such changes or believe they should advance at a slower pace.

=== Libraries ===
The Douglas County Libraries public library system is based in Castle Rock, co-located with the local branch library, the Philip S. Miller Library, south of downtown. The Miller Library includes archives and local history and offers several educational and recreational programs to the public. Also, it includes Little Free Library places scattered throughout, such as in the festival park.

== Infrastructure ==
=== Transportation ===
Interstate 25 and U.S. Route 87 run concurrently north-south through Castle Rock. U.S. Route 85, also a north-south route, enters the town from the northwest, meeting I-25 at Exit 184; south of the exit, it runs concurrently with I-25 and U.S. 87. Colorado State Highway 86, an east-west route, enters Castle Rock from the east, then turns north and west as Founders Parkway, terminating at its junction with I-25 at Exit 184.

For local transportation within Castle Rock, the town government sponsors a voucher program for reduced-fare taxi service. This service is available to town residents who are disabled or who do not have access to a vehicle. In addition, the Castle Rock Senior Center offers a shuttle service for resident senior citizens.

Castle Rock does not participate in the Denver metropolitan area's Regional Transportation District. Municipal voters decided in November 2005 to opt the town out of the district. As a result, neither bus nor light-rail service to Denver or any of its other suburbs is available from Castle Rock.

BNSF Railway and Union Pacific Railroad each have a freight rail line that runs through Castle Rock. Both lines run parallel to U.S. 85.

=== Utilities and water ===
CORE Electric Cooperative, based in nearby Sedalia, provides electric power. Black Hills Energy provides natural-gas service. Waste Management and other businesses provide trash removal.

The town government's Utilities Department oversees water provision, distribution, and infrastructure maintenance. Historically, nearly all of the water needed by Castle Rock residents was pumped from aquifers below the ground, including the Denver Basin aquifer. Beginning in 2013, when the town developed its first strategic plan for the management of water, Castle Rock has moved toward more use of surface water. Between 2006 and 2018, daily per capita water use in Castle Rock declined from 137 gallons to 115 gallons.

Castle Rock's Plum Creek Water Purification Facility was upgraded in 2021 to support direct potable reuse, a process that treats wastewater to drinking-water standards for reintroduction into the municipal supply. As of 2024, the plant had the technical capability but had not yet begun delivering reclaimed water directly to consumers, pending compliance with Colorado's direct potable reuse regulations adopted in January 2023, which require a full year of water quality monitoring and a community awareness campaign before implementation. The town's long-term goal remains reliance on renewable water resources for 75% of municipal needs by 2050.

As of July 2019 Castle Rock, Denver, and Pitkin County are the first three Colorado municipal or county governments to adopt a state regulation governing greywater reuse.

=== Health care ===
AdventHealth Castle Rock is the only hospital.

== Media ==
Founded in 1895, Castle Rock News-Press is the only newspaper. Castle Rock is part of the Denver radio and television market. Radio station KJMN is licensed to Castle Rock, but broadcasts from Denver playing a Spanish adult hits format on 92.1 FM. Denver radio station 850 KOA, which broadcasts a news/talk and sports format, operates its 50,000-watt transmitter from a site 10 miles northeast of downtown Castle Rock, in the town of Parker. Another Denver station, KAMP (1430 AM), a CBS Sports Radio affiliate with a sports radio format, operates its transmitter from Highlands Ranch, 13 miles north of downtown Castle Rock.

NPR programming can be heard on Colorado Public Radio's KCFR-FM. Castle Rock is also served by the AM signal of KGNU, a noncommercial affiliate of PRI, Pacifica, and the BBC World Service, and which also provides diverse music programming.

Television station KETD, an affiliate of the Estrella TV network, broadcasts on digital channel 46. Licensed to Castle Rock, the station is located near Centennial, Colorado.

== Parks and recreation ==
Castle Rock's open space and parks comprise 27% the town's total land area (5,415 acres (21.91 km^{2}) of parks and open space / 20,224 acres (81.84 km^{2}) total land area). Additionally, there are nearly 75 miles (121 km) of soft-surface and paved trails.

== Culture ==
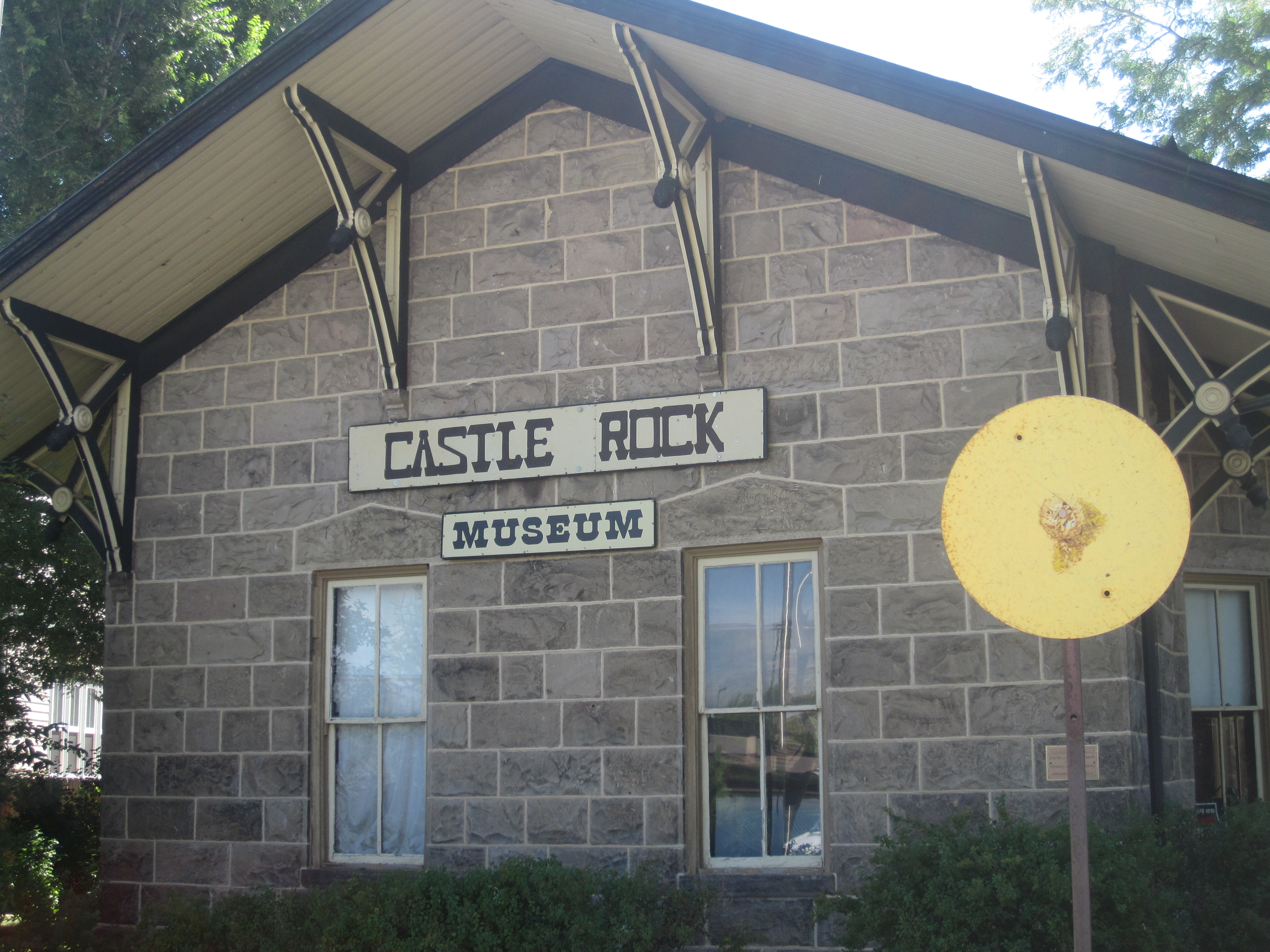
Castle Rock Museum (2010)

=== Points of interest ===
Philip S. Miller Park is the largest park project in Castle Rock. "Phase One" of the park was opened to the public on October 25, 2014. The park is named after a local banker and philanthropist, who with his wife Jerry, left trust monies to Castle Rock in the mid-1990s. The Phillip S. Miller Activity Center is included in the park's 300 acres.

The Castle Rock Historical Museum is in the former Denver and Rio Grande Railway depot building on Elbert Street. This building is purported to have been built in 1875. It is made of rhyolite taken from local quarries. The museum depicts how Castle Rock has changed over the years.

=== Sports ===
From 1986 through 2006, a professional golf tournament was held in Castle Pines Village. The International, a PGA Tour event, was held in August at the Castle Pines Golf Club.

=== Events ===
==== Castle Rock star lighting ====
Since 1936, every Saturday before Thanksgiving, the Town of Castle Rock lights the 45-foot (14 m) electric star upon Castle Rock. A lighting event is held downtown that night and is usually accompanied by a fireworks display. The star remains lit from the week before Thanksgiving to the end of the National Western Stock Show in January. This has changed multiple times; following World War II, it was changed to a V, also, the same year as the Denver Broncos being in the Super Bowl, it was changed to orange and blue. Throughout part of the lockdown in early 2020 due to COVID-19, the star was relit as a symbol of unity.

== Notable people ==
Notable individuals who were born in or have lived in Castle Rock include:

- Amy Adams (born 1974), actress
- Kirsten Bomblies (born 1973), biologist
- Kat Cammack - United States Representative for Florida's 3rd Congressional District
- Jim Cottrell (born 1983), NFL linebacker
- Gary Hallberg (born 1958), professional golfer
- Beth Malone (born 1969), actress
- Christian McCaffrey (born 1996), professional football player (running back)
- Max McCaffrey (born 1994), professional football player (wide receiver)
- Joe Oltmann, political activist and conspiracy theorist
- Will Owen (born 1995), racing driver
- Cortney Palm - actress
- Nelson Rangell (born 1960), jazz musician
- Edward Seidensticker (1921–2007), Japanologist
- Emma Shinn – American military defense attorney
- Ann Strother (born 1983), WNBA player, coach

== Gallery ==
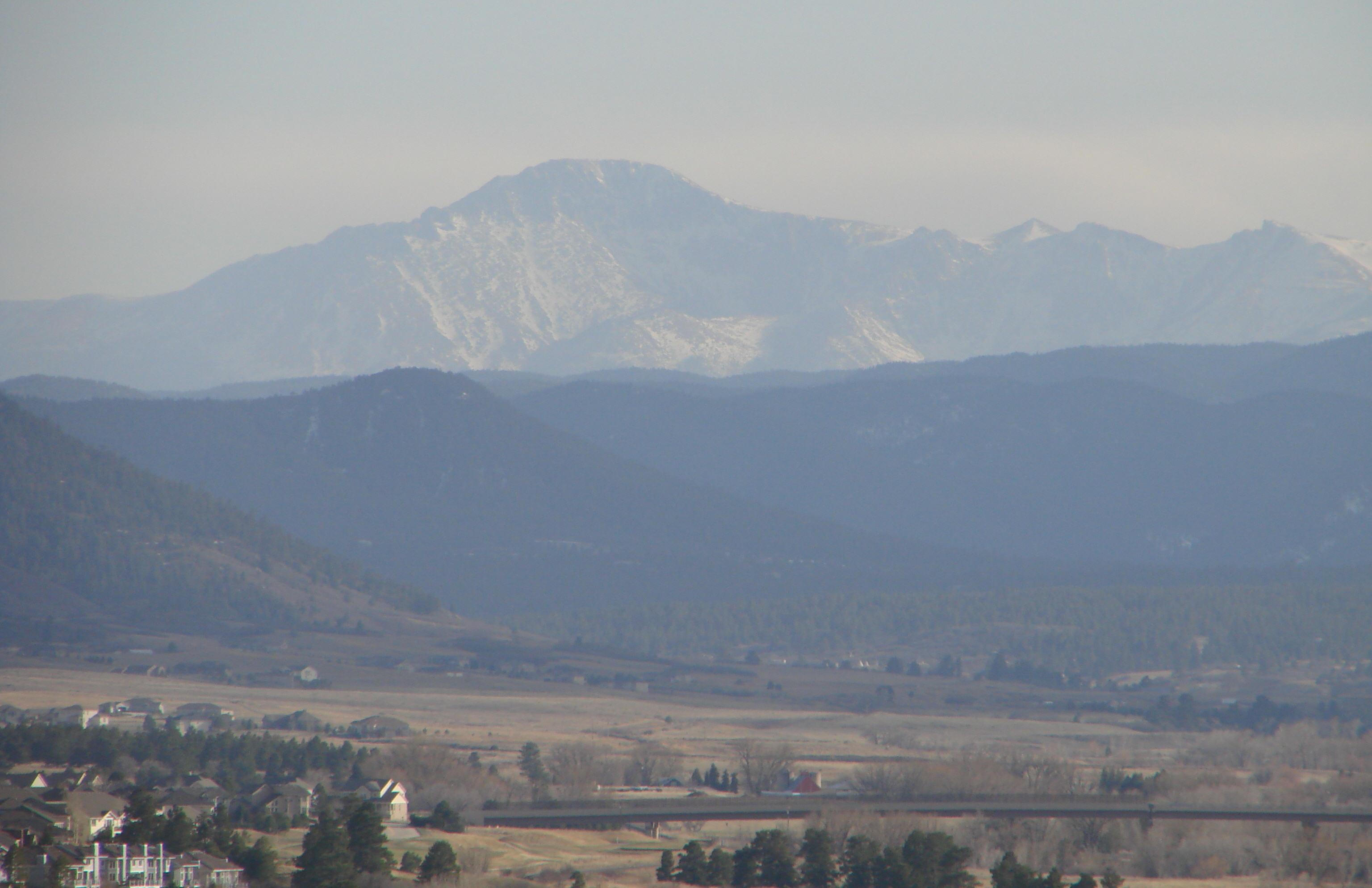
View of Pikes Peak from Rock Park in Castle Rock

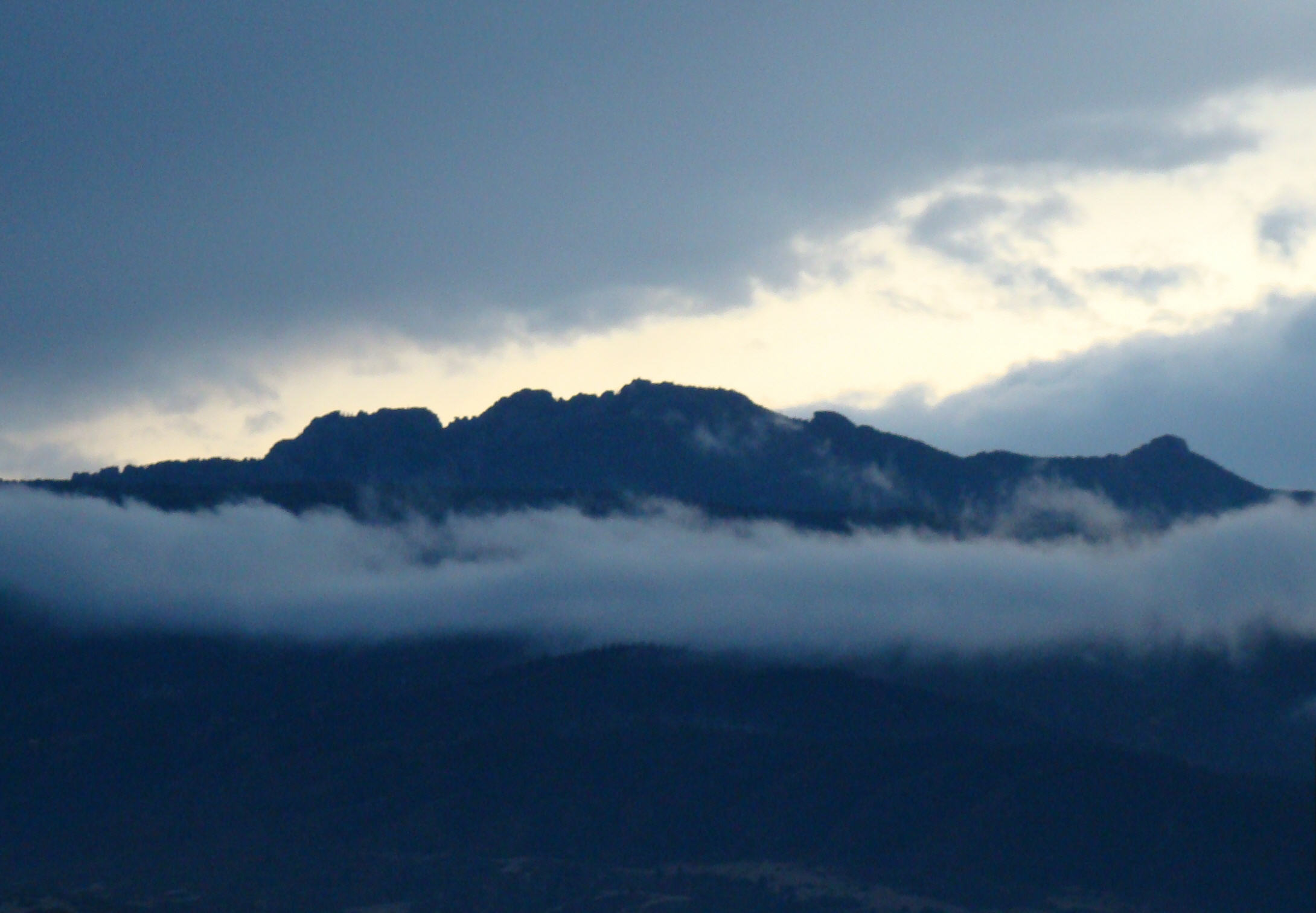
View of Devil's Head Lookout from Ridgeline Open Space in Castle Rock

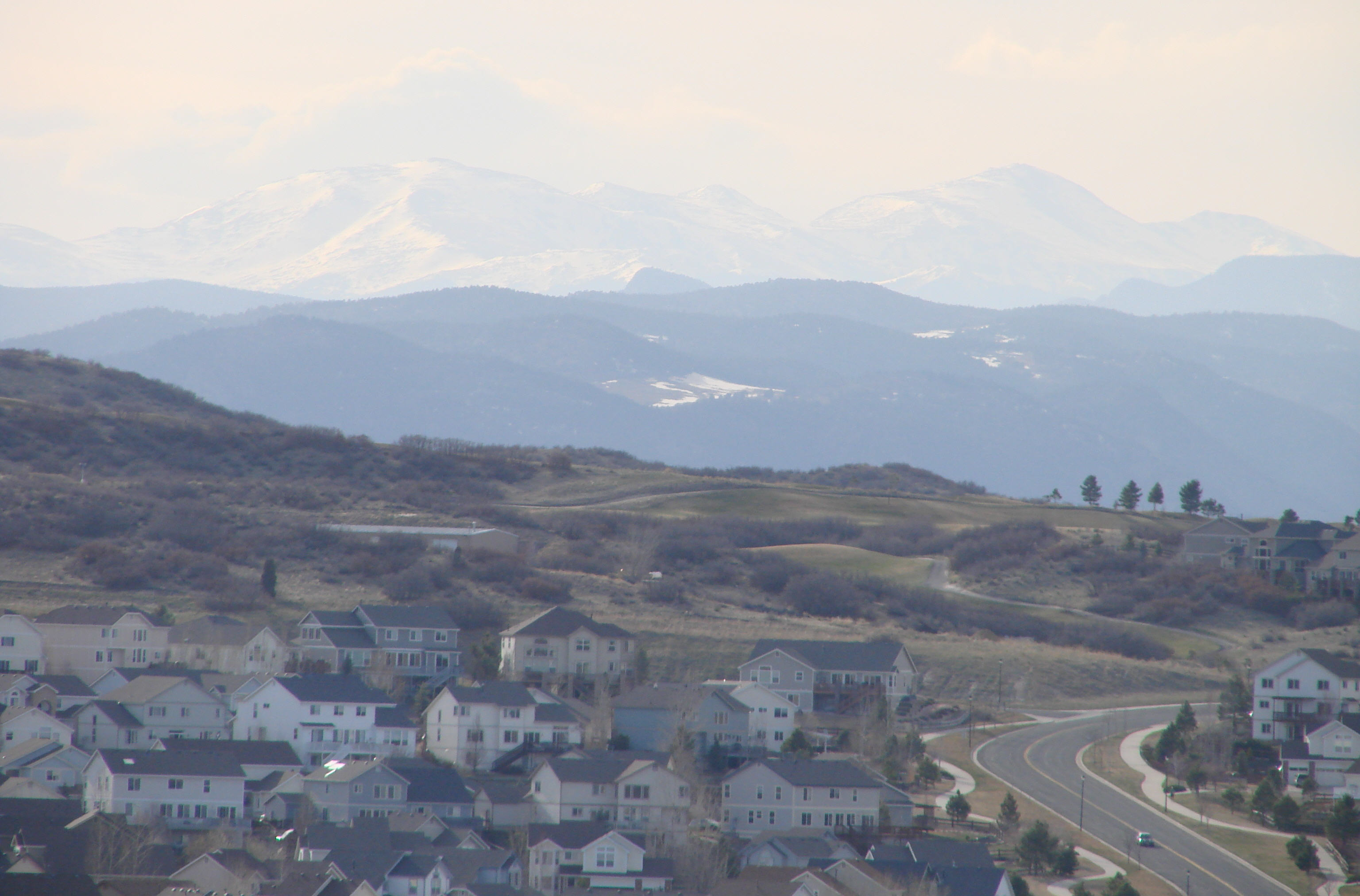
View of Mount Blue Sky from Rock Park in Castle Rock

View from Rock Park Lookout Area in Castle Rock

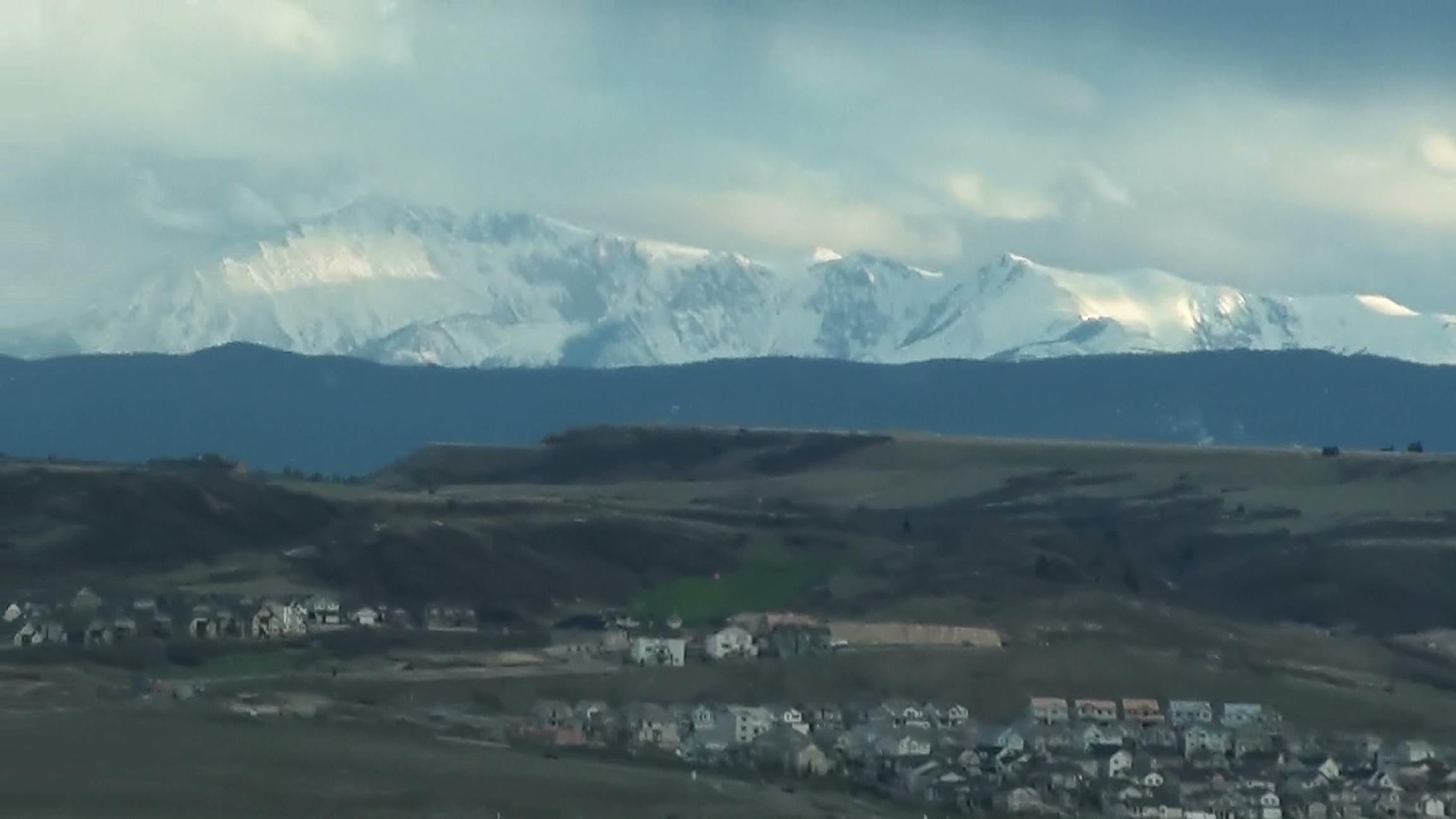
View of Pikes Peak from I-25 in Castle Rock

View of The Meadows neighborhood taken from Daniels Park

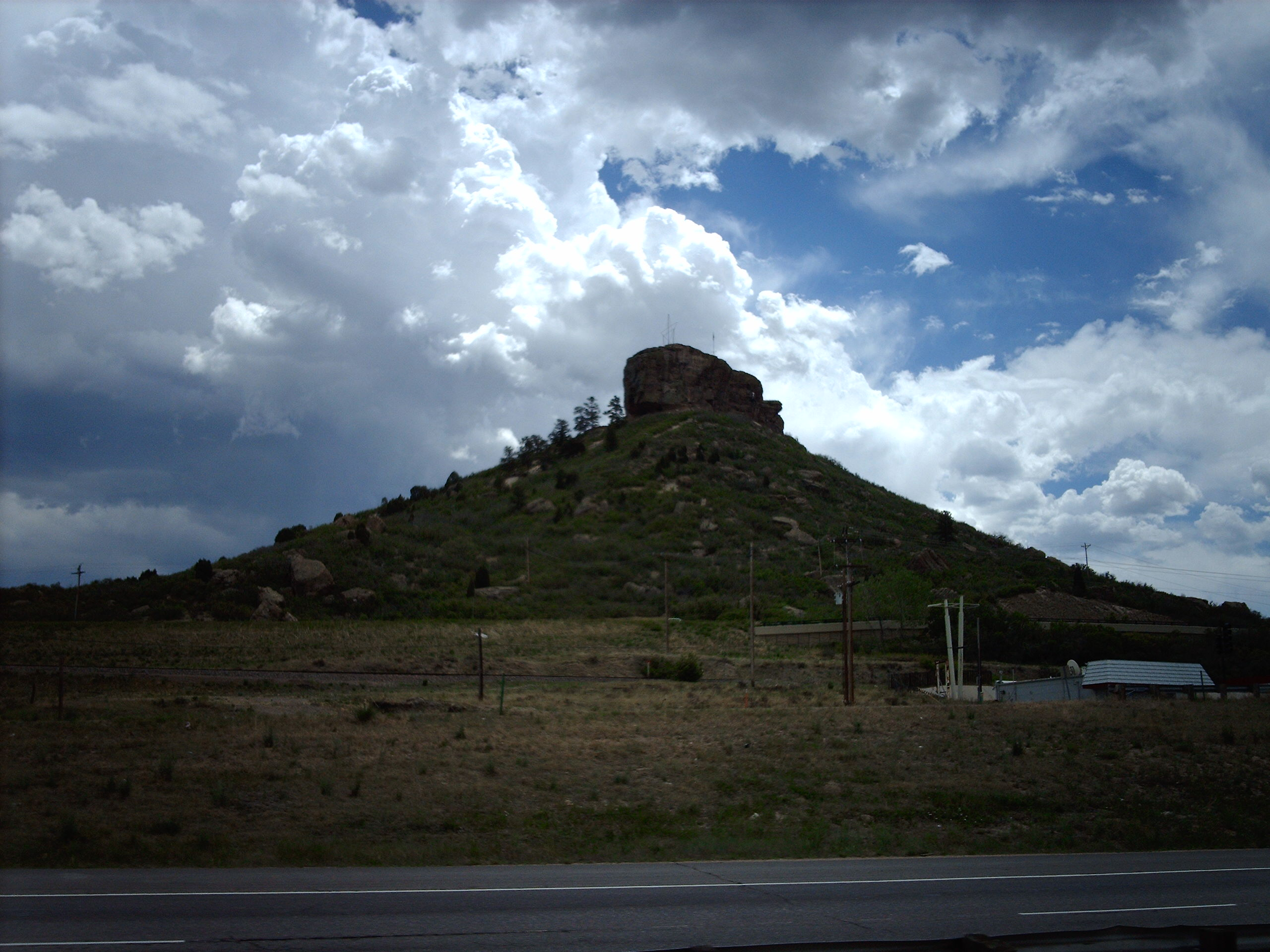
Castle Rock as seen from I-25

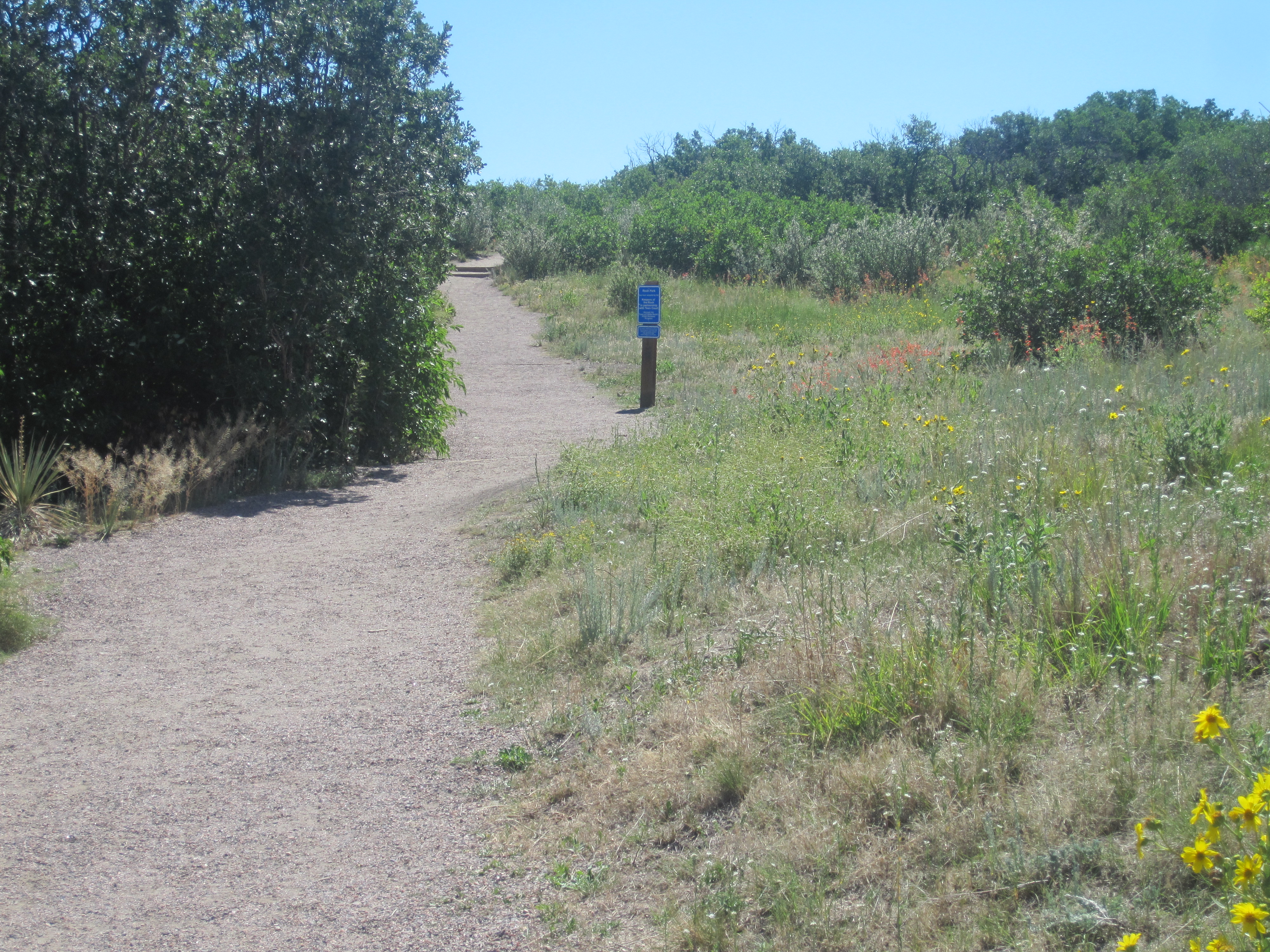
Hiking trail at Rock Park in Castle Rock

== See also ==
- Denver–Aurora–Centennial, CO Metropolitan Statistical Area
- Front Range Urban Corridor
