= Emma Shinn =

American military defense attorney

Emma Shinn (born 1975/1976) is an American military and criminal defense attorney.

== Service and career ==
Emma Shinn enlisted in the United States Marine Corps at age 18 in 1994, serving in the infantry for 11 years, specializing in anti-tank assault (TOW and Javelin gunner). In Operation Phantom Fury in Fallujah, she was an infantry platoon sergeant. Upon returning to the US, Shinn completed Officer Candidate School and was commissioned as a 2nd Lieutenant on 12 August 2005. She was temporarily retired as a judge advocate in May 2014 due to combat-related post-traumatic stress. After recovery through the Veterans Affairs, she later returned to active duty in 2019 and was subsequently promoted to the rank of major.. She retired from the U.S. Marine Corps on March 31, 2026, following over 31 years of service as a Marine on both active duty and a reservist.

Shinn served as an enlisted Marine in California, Okinawa, North Carolina, the Congo, Sierra Leone, Tunisia, and Iraq. As a judge advocate, she served in Virginia, Rhode Island, Okinawa, Guantanamo, the Pentagon, and Camp Pendleton, California. Shinn also served as the president of SPART*A, a nonprofit led by, and serving, transgender people who currently serve or have served in the military. She is also the co-founder of the Colorado Name Change Project, a nonprofit dedicated to assisting trans Coloradans with their legal name changes and gender marker corrections.

== Personal life ==
Shinn identifies as both trans and queer. She transitioned in 2016, the year openly transgender people were allowed to serve under rules set in place by President Barack Obama. Even though President Donald Trump reversed the ruling in 2017, Shinn persevered and returned to active duty in 2019.
