= Ridgeline Open Space =

Public park in Colorado

Coordinates: 39°22′24″N 104°54′16″W

Ridgeline Open Space is a public park located within The Meadows neighborhood in Castle Rock, Colorado along the Front Range of the Rocky Mountains. It sits at an elevation of 6,607 feet (2,014 m) and consists of 370 acres (1.5 km^{2}) of public land that has been designated for conservation and recreational use. There are over 8 mi (13 km) of trails with panoramic views of the Rocky Mountains to the west and Castle Rock below.

== Wildlife and vegetation ==
- Mammals that can be found in this area include the American badger, American black bear, bobcat, coyote, Colorado chipmunk, gray fox, red fox, mountain cottontail rabbit, mountain lion, mule deer, pocket gopher, porcupine, and skunk.
- Birds that can be found in this area include the golden eagle, peregrine falcon, sharp-shinned hawk, black-billed magpie, red-tailed hawk, pinyon jay and western tanager.
- Trees that can be found in the area include the Gambel oak, ponderosa pine, and pinyon pine.

== Gallery ==
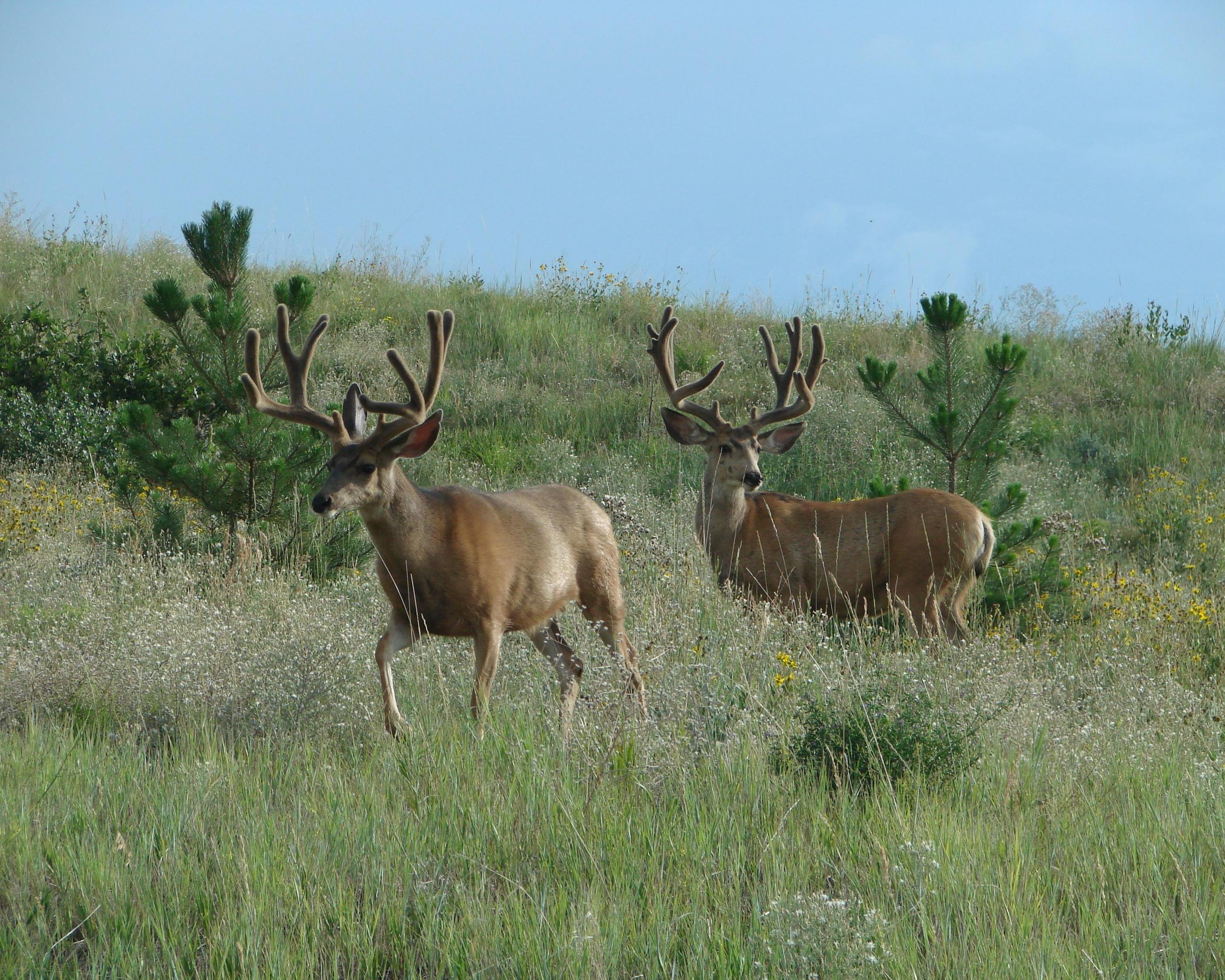
Two mule deer grazing

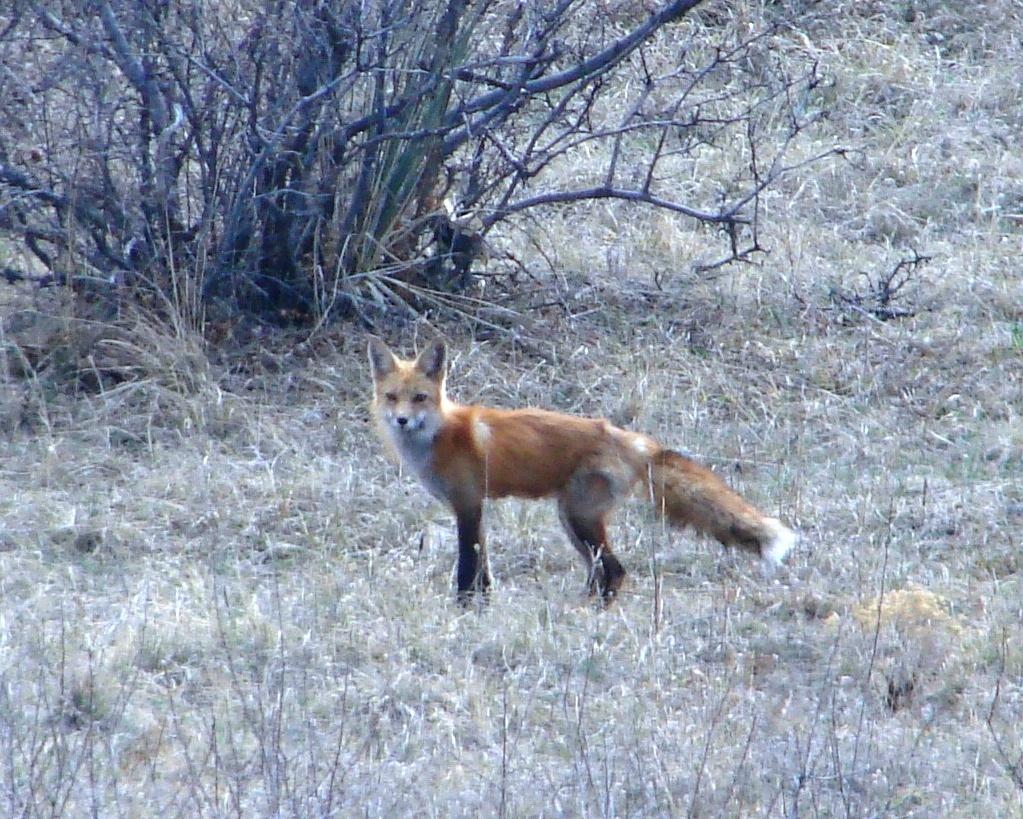
Red fox

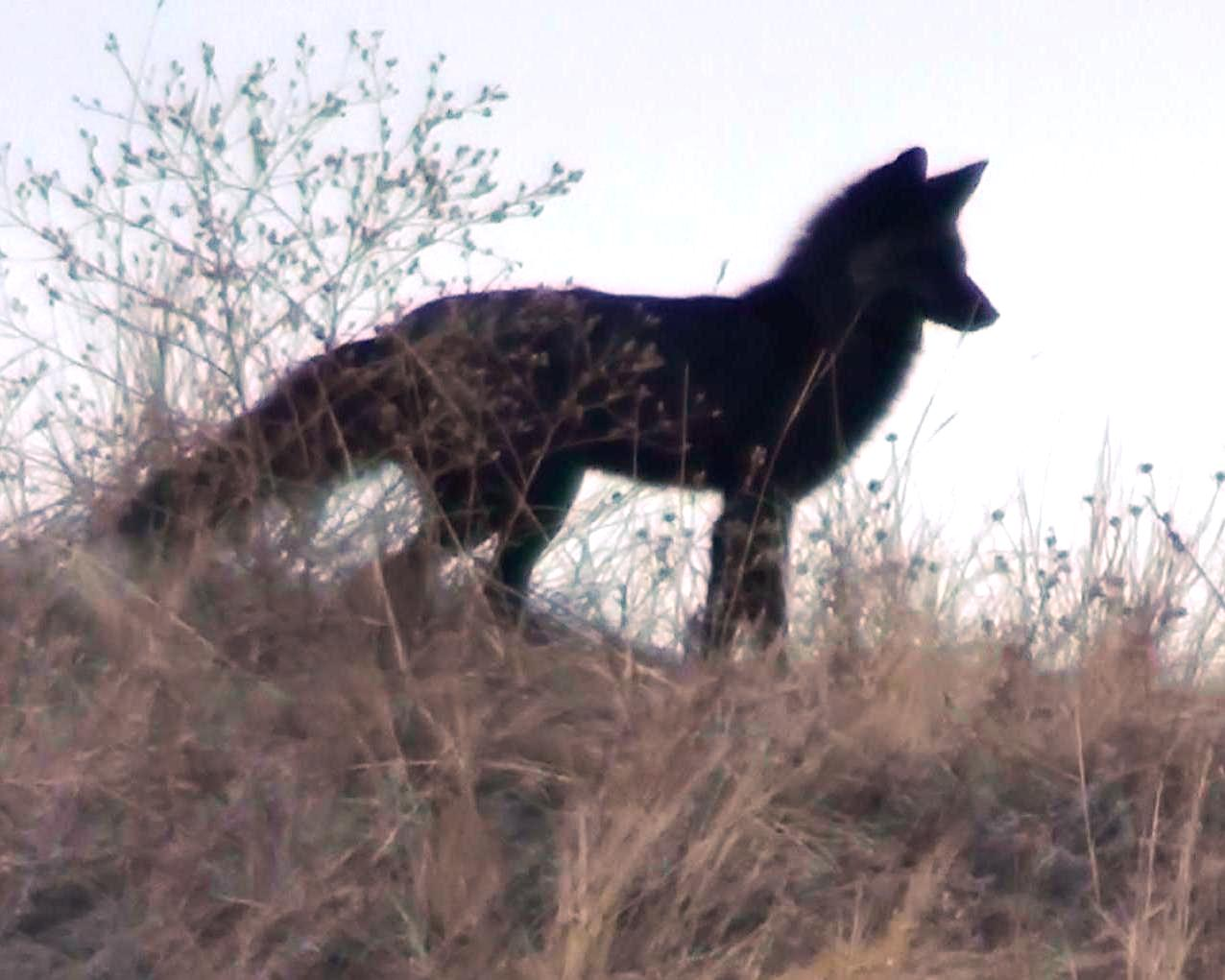
Red fox (during its black pelt color phase)
