= Castle Rock (Colorado) =

Butte in Castle Rock, Colorado, United States

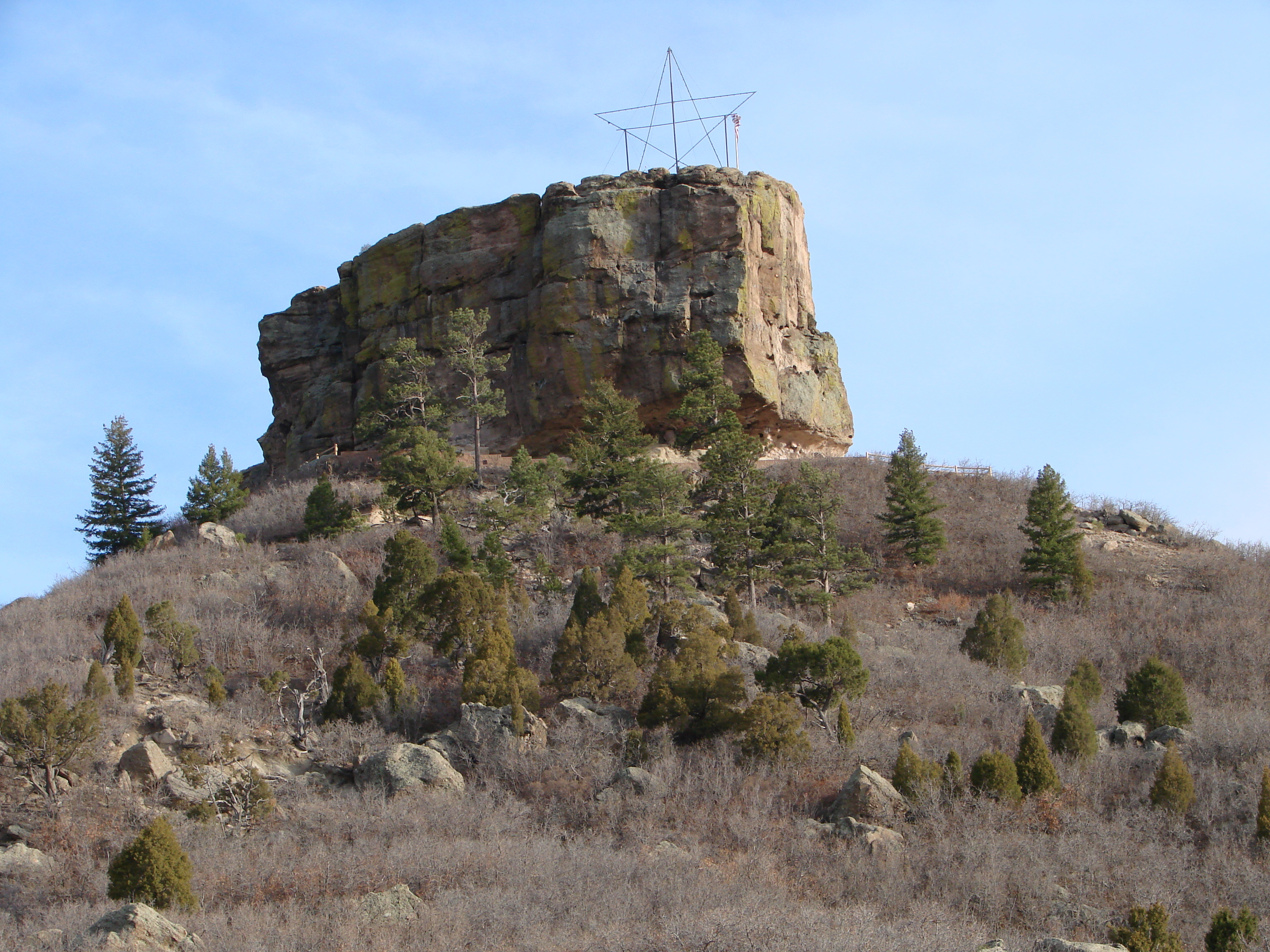

Highest point
- Elevation: 6,590 ft (2,010 m)
- Prominence: 370 ft (110 m)
- Coordinates: 39°22′44.72″N 104°51′21.79″W

Geography
- Location within Colorado Location within the United States
- Location: Castle Rock, Douglas County, Colorado, United States

Castle Rock is a butte in the Colorado Piedmont region of the Great Plains. An area landmark, it is the namesake of the town of Castle Rock, Colorado.

The mesa’s caprock consists of rhyolite, rock which is strongly resistant to erosion. About 58 million years ago, a volcanic eruption took place that covered the area around Castle Rock with 20 feet (6.1 m) of rhyolite. After a few million years, mass flooding and erosion of the volcanic rock gave way to the butte-shaped mesa that almost resembles plateau.

Public hiking trails on the mesa are in Rock Park, at the intersection of Front Street and Canyon Drive in the town of Castle Rock. The trailhead and parking are about two blocks south of the intersection on Front Street, for a 1.4-mile round-trip hike to the base of the town's namesake (climbing the rest of the way to the summit is discouraged by a sign warning that the loose rocks are a fall hazard). Other trailheads can be found along Canyon Drive and Sunset Drive.
