= Highlands Ranch High School =

Public high school in Colorado, US

Location
- 9375 South Cresthill Lane; Highlands Ranch, Colorado 80130; United States; 39°32′56″N 104°55′50″W

Information
- Type: Public secondary school
- Motto: Soaring for Excellence—Choose Your Altitude
- Established: 1987 (39 years ago)
- School district: Douglas County School District RE-1
- CEEB code: 060742
- Principal: Julia Caley
- Staff: 83.79 (FTE)
- Faculty: 99
- Grades: 9-12
- Student to teacher ratio: 16.59
- Campus type: Suburban
- Colors: Silver, black, blue
- Fight song: "Mighty Falcons" (to the tune of "Mighty Oregon")
- Athletics: 5A (4A for football)
- Athletics conference: Continental League; Football: South Metro 4A
- Mascot: Falcons
- Rivals: Rock Canyon High School, Mountain Vista High School, ThunderRidge High School, Valor Christian High School
- Newspaper: HRHS Chronicle
- Yearbook: Talon
- Website: hrhs.dcsdk12.org

Highlands Ranch High School, commonly referred to as Ranch or HRHS, is a public high school in Highlands Ranch, Colorado. It is part of the Douglas County School District. Its school colors are blue, black, and silver, and its mascot is the Falcon. HRHS has 1,390 students in grades 9-12, as well as 83 teachers on staff.

== History ==
Highlands Ranch opened in 1987 as the third high school in the district, after Douglas County High School in Castle Rock and Ponderosa High School in Parker. It was the first high school in Highlands Ranch. The rapid population growth in northern Douglas County has resulted in the opening of three other high schools in the area since Highlands Ranch High School opened.

== Sports ==
Highlands Ranch High School participates at the 5A level in the Colorado Continental League conference. HRHS girls' basketball has had a long-standing dominance in Colorado. Under coach Caryn Jarocki, they won seven state championships between 2000 and 2011.

== Performing Arts ==
Highlands Ranch High School performing arts programs have been recognized nationwide, with their choir even performing at Carnegie Hall.

== Notable alumni ==
- Erin Baxter (class of 1995), former professional soccer player in the WUSA.
- Ryan Burr (class of 2012), pitcher for the Chicago White Sox
- Mike Conneen, reporter for WJLA-TV in Washington, D.C.
- Brian Johnson (class of 1997), former AFL fullback
- Jason Kaiser (class of 1992), former NFL, CFL, XFL and AFL safety
- Drake Nugent (class of 2019), football center for the Michigan Wolverines
- Mike Purcell (class of 2009), NFL defensive lineman for the Denver Broncos
- Keri Russell, Golden Globe-winning actress and dancer
- Daniel Schlereth (class of 2004), MLB pitcher for the Detroit Tigers and son of ESPN NFL analyst Mark Schlereth
- Brad Stisser (class of 2005), professional soccer player for AC St. Louis
- Ann Strother (class of 2002), Director of Operations for Colorado Buffaloes women's basketball and former WNBA player
- Kasey Studdard (class of 2002), former NFL offensive guard
- Craig Thompson (class of 2004), soccer player for the Real Colorado Foxes
- Courtney Zablocki, (class of 1999) 2-time Olympic luger
