= Chris Martinez =

Chris Martinez may refer to:

- Chris Martinez (soccer) (born 1970), American soccer defender
- Chris Martinez (director), Filipino film scriptwriter, director, producer and playwright
