= Ponderosa High School =

Ponderosa High School may refer to:

- Ponderosa High School (California), Shingle Springs, California
- Ponderosa High School (Colorado), Parker, Colorado
