= Nolan Laufenberg =

American football player (born 1999)

Profile
- Position: Guard

Personal information
- Born: March 25, 1999 (age 27); Castle Rock, Colorado, U.S.
- Listed height: 6 ft 3 in (1.91 m)
- Listed weight: 312 lb (142 kg)

Career information
- High school: Castle View (Castle Rock)
- College: Air Force (2016–2020)
- NFL draft: 2021: undrafted

Career history
- Denver Broncos (2021)*; Washington Football Team / Commanders (2021–2023)
- * Offseason or practice squad member only
- Stats at Pro Football Reference

Nolan Laufenberg (born March 25, 1999) is an American football guard. He played college football at Air Force and signed with the Denver Broncos as an undrafted free agent in 2021. Laufenberg has also been a member of the Washington Commanders.

== Early life and education ==
Nolan Laufenberg was born on March 25, 1999, in Castle Rock, Colorado. He attended Castle View High School there, earning three varsity letters in football and two in basketball. He was all-conference on offense in football in three of his four years, being twice on the first-team. Following his senior year of 2016, Laufenberg went to the United States Air Force Academy, to play for their Falcon football team. As a true freshman in 2016, Laufenberg did not see any varsity action.

As a sophomore in 2018, Laufenberg appeared in twelve games, and started nine. He played all thirteen games the following year, starting all but one. He was named first-team all-Mountain West Conference and first-team all-Colorado following the season. The 2020 season was shortened due to COVID-19, only allowing him to play six games.

== Professional career ==
=== Denver Broncos ===
After going unselected in the 2021 NFL draft, Laufenberg was signed by the Denver Broncos as an undrafted free agent. In order to play with Denver, he had to get the United States Secretary of Defense's approval to delay his military service five years. He was waived on August 24, 2021.

=== Washington Football Team / Commanders ===
On September 28, 2021, Laufenberg was signed to the practice squad of the Washington Football Team. He signed a reserve/future contract after the 2021 regular season ended.

On August 30, 2022, Laufenberg was waived by the Commanders and signed to the practice squad the next day. He was placed on the practice squad injured reserve on September 21. On January 4, 2023, he was activated off the injured list. Five days later, he signed another reserve/future contract.

On August 29, 2023, Laufenberg was waived by the Commanders and re-signed to the practice squad. He was released on September 6, 2023. He was re-signed to the Commanders practice squad on November 2. He became a free agent when his practice squad contract expired after the season.
