= Castle View High School =

Public high school in Colorado, US

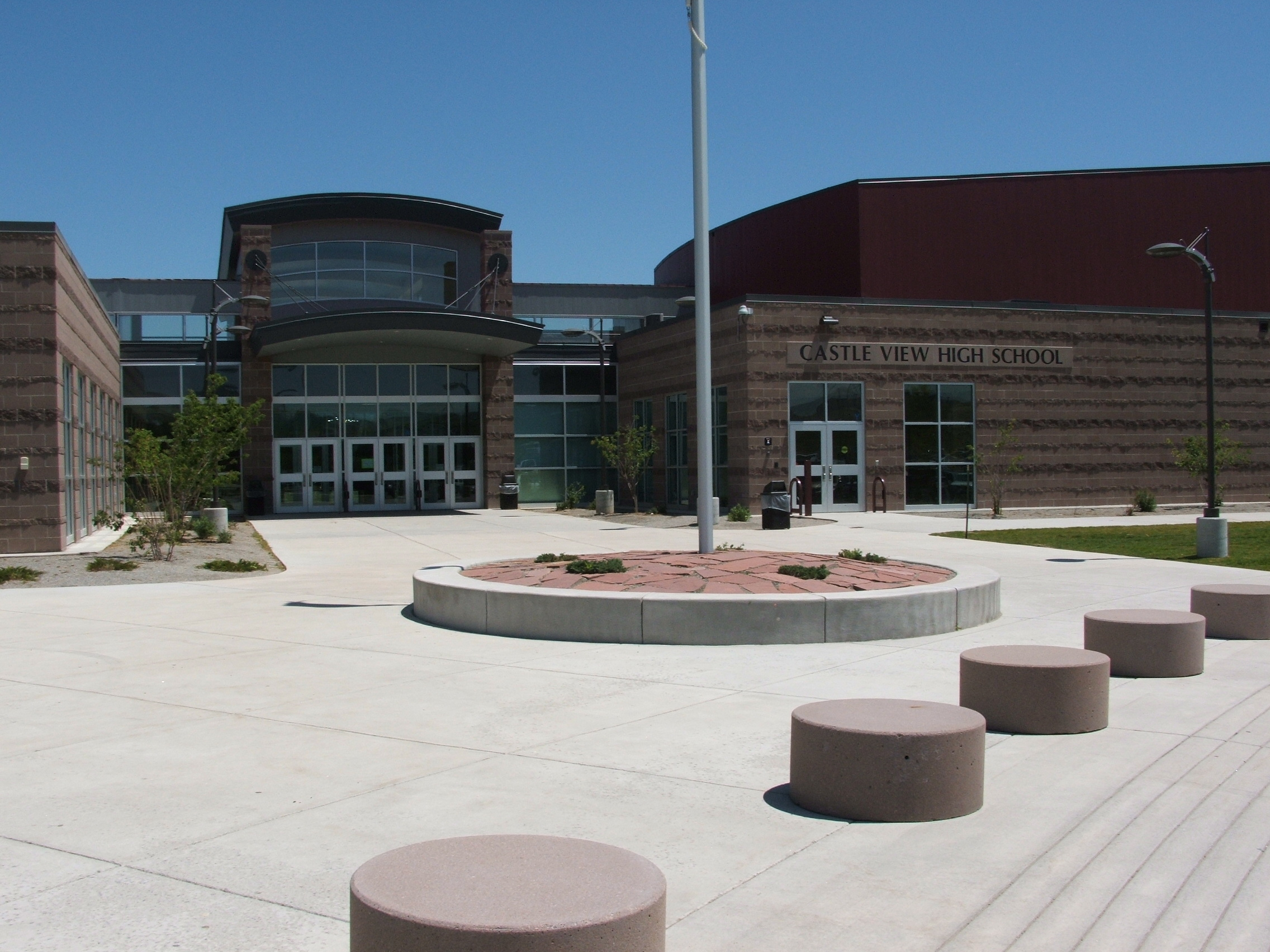

Location
- 5254 North Meadows Drive; Castle Rock, Colorado 80109; United States
- 39°24′35″N 104°53′32″W

Information
- Type: Public secondary school
- Established: 2006 (20 years ago)
- School district: Douglas County School District RE-1
- CEEB code: 060193
- Principal: Jeena Templeton
- Staff: 88.29 (FTE)
- Grades: 9-12
- Student to teacher ratio: 21.10
- Colors: Red, black, gold
- Athletics: 5A
- Athletics conference: Continental League
- Nickname: Sabercats
- Rivals: Douglas County High School Rock Canyon High School
- Website: cvhs.dcsdk12.org

Castle View High School is a public high school in Castle Rock, Colorado. It is part of the Douglas County School District. It opened in August 2006.
