= Warmoth =

Warmoth is a surname. Notable people with the surname include:

- Cy Warmoth (1893–1957), American baseball player
- Henry C. Warmoth (1842–1931), American attorney, Civil War officer, and politician
- Logan Warmoth (born 1995), American baseball player
