= Bobby Dalbec =

American baseball player (born 1995)

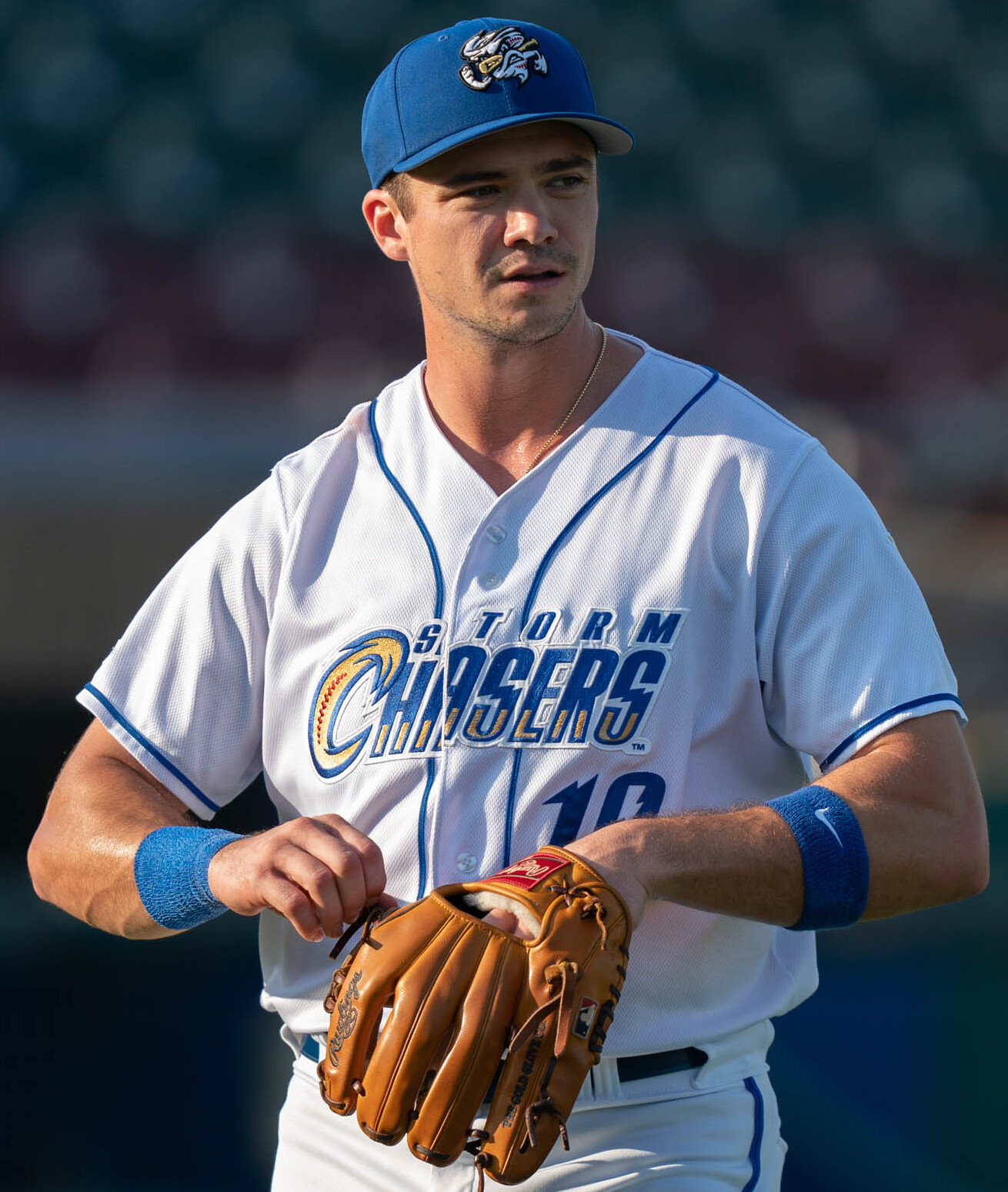
- Dalbec with the Omaha Storm Chasers in 2025

Yomiuri Giants – No. 29
- First baseman / Third baseman
- Born: June 29, 1995 (age 31); Seattle, Washington, U.S.
- Bats: Right Throws: Right

Professional debut
- MLB: August 30, 2020, for the Boston Red Sox
- NPB: March 27, 2026, for the Yomiuri Giants

MLB statistics (through 2025 season)
- Batting average: .222
- Home runs: 47
- Runs batted in: 143

NPB statistics (through September 27, 2026)
- Batting average: .255
- Home runs: 25
- Runs batted in: 81
- Stats at Baseball Reference

Teams
- Boston Red Sox (2020–2024); Chicago White Sox (2025); Yomiuri Giants (2026–present)

Robert Vernon Dalbec (born June 29, 1995) is an American professional baseball infielder for the Yomiuri Giants of Nippon Professional Baseball (NPB). He has previously played in Major League Baseball (MLB) for the Boston Red Sox and Chicago White Sox. He made his MLB debut with the Red Sox in 2020. He played college baseball for the Arizona Wildcats.

== Amateur career ==
Dalbec attended Legend High School in Parker, Colorado, where he played for the school's baseball team as a shortstop and a pitcher. He also played on the basketball team during two seasons. He was not selected in the Major League Baseball (MLB) draft due to his strong commitment to attend the University of Arizona.

Dalbec enrolled at Arizona to play college baseball for the Arizona Wildcats as a third baseman, first baseman, and relief pitcher. In his freshman year, he participated in the National Collegiate Athletic Association's home run derby. After his freshman season in 2014, he played collegiate summer baseball for the Orleans Firebirds of the Cape Cod Baseball League (CCBL), and participated in the league's All Star Home Run Hitting contest. As a sophomore, Dalbec hit .319/.410/.601 with 15 home runs in 213 at bats. Following his sophomore season in 2015, he returned to the Orleans Firebirds, batted .284 with 14 home runs in 33 games, and was named to the CCBL 2015 All-League team. He struggled in his junior year, but began to improve his play later in the season, as the Wildcats qualified for the 2016 College World Series.

== Professional career ==
=== Boston Red Sox ===
==== Minor leagues ====
The Boston Red Sox selected Dalbec in the fourth round of the 2016 Major League Baseball (MLB) draft. He signed with the Red Sox, receiving a $650,000 signing bonus, and made his professional debut with the Low-A Lowell Spinners, where he spent the whole season, posting a .386/.427/.674 slash line with seven home runs and 33 RBI in 34 games.

Dalbec spent 2017 with the Greenville Drive of the Single-A South Atlantic League, slashing .246/.345/.437 with 13 home runs and 39 RBI in 78 games as well as batting .259 in seven rehab games with the Gulf Coast League Red Sox after returning from a wrist injury.

In 2018, Dalbec started season with the Salem Red Sox of the High-A Carolina League. In 100 games with Salem, he slashed .256/.372/.573 while leading the league with 26 home runs and 85 RBI in 344 at-bats. Dalbec was promoted to the Portland Sea Dogs of the Double-A Eastern League on August 3. In September, Dalbec received the minor league Offensive Player of the Year and Defensive Player of the Year awards from the Red Sox. He also won the Carolina League Most Valuable Player Award. After the regular season, he played for the Mesa Solar Sox of the Arizona Fall League.

In 2019, Dalbec began the season with Portland and was promoted to the Pawtucket Red Sox of the Triple-A International League in early August. Overall during 2019, he slashed .239/.356/.460 with 27 home runs and 73 RBI in 135 games. After the season, Dalbec represented the United States national team in the 2019 WBSC Premier 12. He was named the best first baseman in the tournament.

==== Major Leagues ====
On November 20, 2019, the Red Sox added Dalbec to their 40-man roster to protect him from the Rule 5 draft. He was optioned to Pawtucket on March 8, 2020. On July 7, the team announced that he had tested positive for COVID-19; he remained asymptomatic. On August 30, Dalbec was added to Boston's active roster following the trade of Mitch Moreland. Dalbec made his MLB debut that day, against the Washington Nationals; his first major league hit was a third-inning home run off of Javy Guerra, coming in his second at bat. Through his first 10 major league games, Dalbec hit six home runs, including five straight games with a home run. During the shortened 2020 Red Sox season, Dalbec batted .263 with eight home runs and 16 RBI in 23 games. Following the 2020 season, Dalbec was ranked by Baseball America as the Red Sox' third best prospect.

The Red Sox named Dalbec their starting first baseman for Opening Day in 2021. On July 29, he became the tallest player ever to make an appearance at shortstop for the Red Sox. During August, he batted .339 with seven home runs and 21 RBI and was named the AL Rookie of the Month. For the regular season, Dalbec played in 133 games for Boston, batting .240 with 25 home runs and 78 RBI. He appeared in eight postseason games, batting 0-for-12 as the Red Sox advanced to the American League Championship Series.

Dalbec began 2022 as Boston's primary first baseman. Following a lack of offensive production at the position, the team began using outfielder Franchy Cordero at first base in May, then acquired first baseman Eric Hosmer at the trade deadline in early August. On September 4, with a .211 batting average for the season, the team optioned Dalbec to Triple-A to clear roster space for call-up Triston Casas. Dalbec was recalled to Boston on September 22, when Trevor Story was placed on the injured list. For the season, Dalbec batted .215 with 12 home runs and 39 RBI in 117 games for Boston. In 13 games with the Triple-A Worcester Red Sox, he batted .250 with five home runs and eight RBI.

In 2023, the Red Sox optioned Dalbec to Worcester for Opening Day. He was recalled to Boston for a week in April and a week in May. Through his first 40 games with Worcester, he was batting .310 with 14 home runs and 35 RBI. Dalbec was again recalled to Boston for less than a week in the second half of June. In mid-September, Dalbec was recalled by Boston due to an injury to Casas.

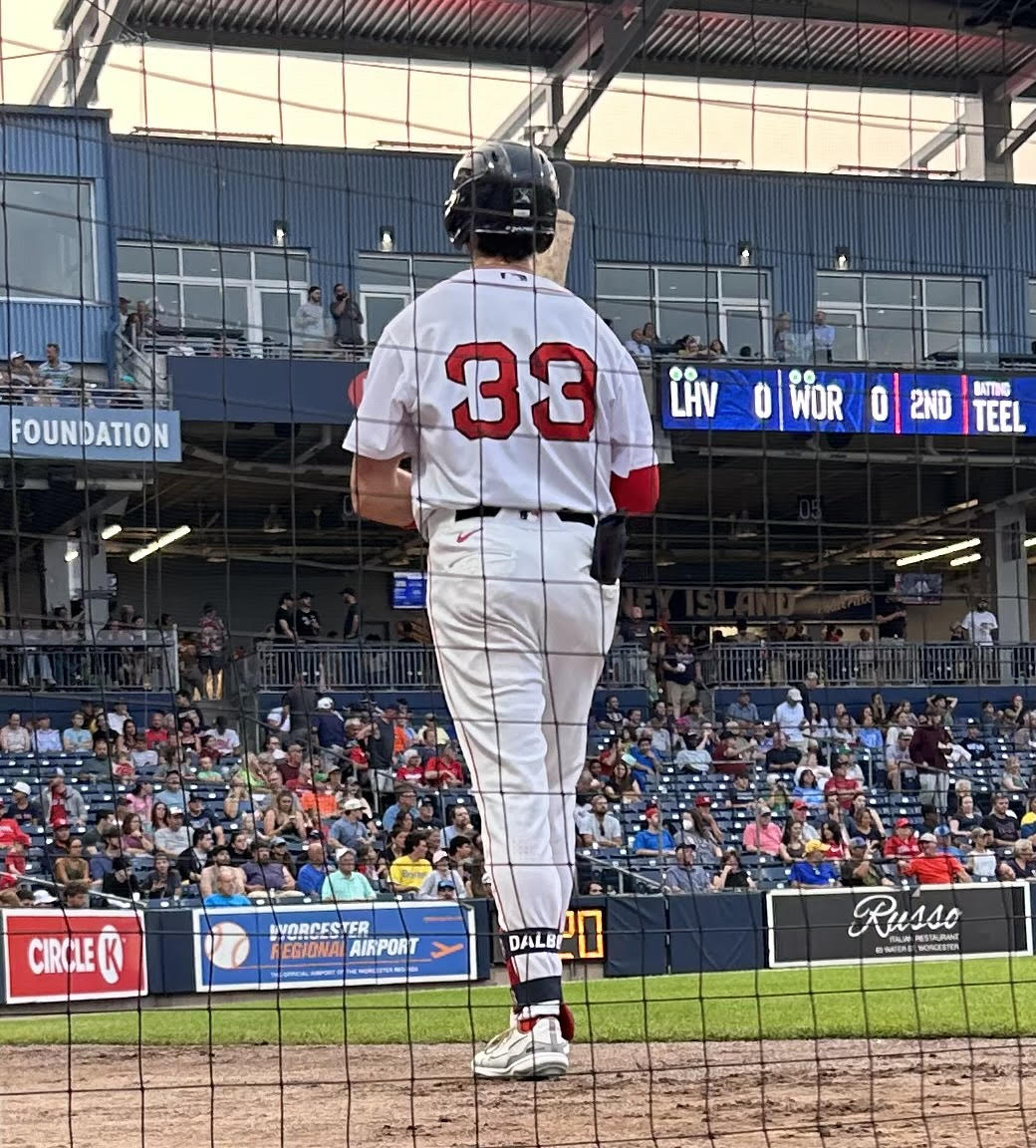
Dalbec with the Worcester Red Sox in 2024

Dalbec made Boston's Opening Day roster to begin the 2024 season. After appearing in six games (three starts), he was optioned to Worcester on April 9. Dalbec was recalled to Boston on April 12; in his first 32 big league at-bats of the season, he had one hit and 18 strikeouts. Dalbec was again optioned on May 3 and recalled on June 2. On June 8, he hit his first major league home run of the season, and first since September 20, 2023. Dalbec was optioned to Worcester a third time on June 22. In 37 games for the Red Sox, he slashed .133/.217/.193 with one home run, eight RBI, and three stolen bases. Dalbec was designated for assignment by Boston on September 8, removing him from the 40-man roster; he was sent outright to Worcester two days later. Dalbec elected free agency on November 2.

=== Chicago White Sox ===
On January 7, 2025, Dalbec signed a minor league contract with the Chicago White Sox. He was assigned to the Triple-A Charlotte Knights to begin the year and hit .326 with four home runs and 13 RBI in his first 12 games. On April 21, the White Sox selected Dalbec's contract, adding him to their active roster. In seven games for Chicago, he went 4-for-18 (.222) with one RBI and three walks. Dalbec was designated for assignment by the White Sox on May 4. He cleared waivers and elected free agency on May 6.

=== Milwaukee Brewers ===
On May 10, 2025, Dalbec signed a minor league contract with the Milwaukee Brewers. In 61 appearances for the Triple-A Nashville Sounds, he batted .266/.356/.498 with 12 home runs, 44 RBI, and three stolen bases. On August 2, Dalbec opted out his contract with Milwaukee and became a free agent.

=== Kansas City Royals ===
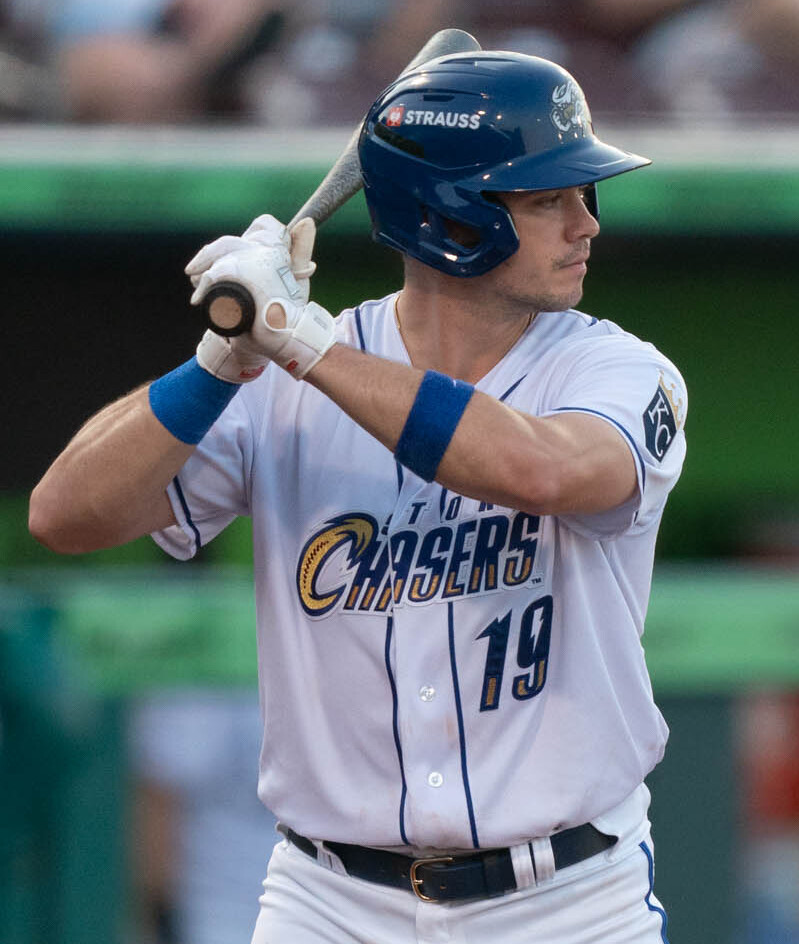
Dalbec with the Omaha Storm Chasers in 2025

On August 8, 2025, Dalbec signed a minor league contract with the Kansas City Royals. He made 32 appearances for the Triple-A Omaha Storm Chasers, batting .252/.336/.512 with eight home runs, 25 RBI, and one stolen base. Dalbec elected free agency following the season on November 6.

=== Yomiuri Giants ===
On December 21, 2025, Dalbec signed a one-year, $1 million contract with the Yomiuri Giants of Nippon Professional Baseball. He finished the season slashing .252, with 25 Home Runs and 81 RBI.

== Personal life ==
Dalbec grew up in Parker, Colorado, and was a fan of the Seattle Mariners, Seattle Seahawks, and Oklahoma City Thunder. He is interested in the music industry and is able to play the guitar and piano.
