= Ponderosa High School (Colorado) =

Public high school in Colorado, US

Location
- 7007 East Bayou Gulch Road; Parker, Colorado 80134; United States; 39°26′10″N 104°45′22″W

Information
- School type: Public high school
- Motto: Proud, Productive, Proven
- Established: January 1983 (43 years ago)
- School district: Douglas County RE-1
- CEEB code: 061151
- NCES School ID: 080345001341
- Principal: Ryan Hollingshead
- Teaching staff: 76.80 (on an FTE basis)
- Grades: 9–12
- Enrollment: 1,424 (2023–2024)
- Student to teacher ratio: 18.54
- Colors: Cardinal and gold
- Athletics conference: CHSAA
- Mascot: Mustang
- Newspaper: The Mustang Express
- Feeder schools: Sagewood Middle School
- Website: phs.dcsdk12.org

Ponderosa High School, commonly referred to as Pondo or PHS, is a public high school in Parker, Colorado. It is part of the Douglas County School District RE-1. Located in The Pinery, an unincorporated community south of Parker along SH 83, Ponderosa is the second oldest high school in Douglas County and the original high school in the Parker area. The school's team name is "The Mustangs" which was first adopted in 1980.

Ponderosa first opened its doors in January 1983, five months later than anticipated due to construction delays. The school began with three grades with a small capacity but then added its fourth grade in 1992 as the population in Douglas County grew, thus increasing enrollment. Around the same time, additional classrooms were added on to the school to benefit the student capacity. Enrollment later dropped when two more high schools were added in the Parker area, when Chaparral opened and then later, Legend.

The school earned an "Excellent" rating by the Colorado Student Assessment Program in 2004, and a "High" score in 2005.

== History ==
Construction for Ponderosa High School began in December 1980 and the school first opened its doors on January 26, 1983. Originally scheduled to open in the fall of 1982 to start the 1982–83 school year, the opening date was postponed due to construction issues. It was then delayed again due to a leaky gym roof that pushed the opening date back close to the end of the month. The school first began with only grades 10, 11, and 12, with approximately 1,000 to 1,200 students a year. The first Cardinal and Gold class to graduate was in 1984, thus completing the first whole school year for Pondo. The student capacity then expanded up to 1,500 students by 1992, adding a 9th grade class. Around the same time, 23 additional classrooms were added. In 1994, 13 more classrooms were added with additional trailer classrooms outside due to the population growth throughout Douglas County as well as the completion of expanding the commons, bumping the student capacity to approximately 1,900 and later to 2,100 by 1996. By 1997, enrollment decreased for the first time ever due to the opening of Chaparral High School, falling to 1,800. It then grew back up to 2,000 by 2007 but decreased again to 1,375 in 2008 when Legend High School opened.

== Incidents ==
=== Teacher–student relationship controversy ===
In 2005, Ponderosa teacher Nicole Rea Barnhart became a registered sex offender after it was discovered that she was having an intimate relationship with one of her sophomore students.

=== April 2007 bomb scare ===
On April 20, 2007, former Ponderosa student Caleb Pegues, as a prank, set off a stink bomb in an area frequented by students who allegedly smoked marijuana in the area. The date, April 20 (4/20) holds some significance to many people, as well as being the anniversary of the Columbine High School massacre. The stink bomb consisted of a combination of various household chemicals. Reports indicated that either a toilet bowl cleaner or ammonia was put in a plastic bottle along with a piece of tin foil. This reaction created a gas, causing the plastic bottle to expand until it burst. The gas created by such a mixture reportedly smells like rotten eggs.

As a result of this prank, Pegues was arrested, charged as an adult under Colorado's Direct File Statute by District Attorney for Colorado's 18th Judicial District, Carol Chambers, for committing several felonies before any investigation.

Chambers was criticized harshly by the public for overreacting and filing excessive charges against Pegues. Many newspaper stories expressed the opinion that it was not appropriate that Chambers charge the juvenile as an adult for what most would consider nothing more than a childish prank.

=== Security guard incident ===
On November 28, 2016, former Ponderosa security guard Gary Postell sexually assaulted a 15 year old girl on school grounds and was arrested at his home in Castle Rock the next day. He was booked into the Douglas County Jail on a $5,000 bond and was later sentenced to eight years in prison on October 15, 2018.

=== 2025 Bomb Threat ===
On March 4, 2025, a 15 year old male student brought an explosive device into Ponderosa High School. At around 9:30 AM, the school resource officer received an anonymous message via the Safe 2 Tell Colorado app that a student had allegedly brought in a 'suspicious device'. The student was later detained and searched by in-school security and law enforcement. When the device was located, the school initially went into a hold position. Students and staff were not allowed into the hallways. Parents received a text message through the school district. At around 10:00 AM, all students were told to evacuate. The Douglas County Sheriff's tactical bomb squad arrived on scene along with the ATF Denver Metro Division safely removed the explosive device from the school grounds. As of June, 2025, the bomb type has not been publicly announced and the 15 year old male has still not been identified and is awaiting trial. The District Attorney of Douglas County has opened up a case where the teen could face multiple attempted murder charges. No students or staff were harmed and Governor Jared Polis made a public statement saying "Safe 2 Tell Colorado is very helpful in situations like these, I applaud the people who stepped forward to report an incident before it could've become deadly. Thanks to the SRO and security team. Ponderosa High School is safe once more".

== Extracurricular activities ==
=== Athletics ===
The Ponderosa Mustangs have a total of 23 varsity sports activities which all distribute in the fall, winter, and spring. They compete in a CHSAA 4A level in the state and also compete for The Pride of Parker Trophy with the cross-town rival the Chaparral Wolverines and also have a rival with the Legend Titans. The school moved down to CHSAA 4A from 5A starting in the 2011–12 school year, due to the foundation of Legend High School in 2008.

==== Championships ====
Ponderosa has won ten 5A state wrestling titles since 1997, including eight consecutive wins between 2003 and 2010. The seventh consecutive win broke a 60-year-old record set in 1944–1949 by Denver North. As well as 12 state championships from the Poms/Dance team, with the most recent championship, 2019. In addition, Ponderosa has a perfect 167–0 conference dual record from 1994 to the present. NFHS Coaches Association National Wrestling coach of the year Tim Ottmann retired after 2008 and the team is now coached by Tito Rinaldis.

Ponderosa has also won state championships in Football (2003), Girls Basketball (1986), Boys Basketball (1988), Girls Softball (1992), Girls Volleyball (2009), Boys Lacrosse (2014), Boys Ice Hockey (2015), and Boys Baseball (2021).

=== Band program ===
The Ponderosa High School bands have a history in the Parker community. The Marching Band has been state champions nine times, last winning in 2001. The Winter Percussion Ensemble won the Colorado state championship in 2019, came in second place in 2008, and has won numerous awards throughout its history. In 2011, the school hired Bill Phalen as band director.

== Notable alumni ==
- Bryan King (baseball), Pitcher for the Houston Astros
- Jennifer Allison, Denver radio personality "Tracy Taylor" on 92.5 the Wolf
- Dylan Carey, baseball player
- Scott Elrod, television and movie actor
- Trent Gamble former Miami Dolphins safety
- John Grant, musician and songwriter
- Naomi Grossman, television and movie actress
- Ian Heinisch, mixed martial artist in the Ultimate Fighting Championship
- Chris Martinez, former Colorado Rapids defender
- Tracy Lindsey Melchior, television actress
- Will Ohman, Florida Marlins relief pitcher
- Dana Perino, former White House Press Secretary
