= Jim Cottrell =

American football player (born 1983)

Profile
- Position: Linebacker

Personal information
- Born: January 13, 1983 (age 43); Castle Rock, Colorado
- Listed height: 6 ft 2 in (1.88 m)
- Listed weight: 257 lb (117 kg)

Career information
- High school: Castle Rock (CO) Douglas County
- College: New Mexico State
- NFL draft: 2006: undrafted

Career history
- Baltimore Ravens (2006–2007)*; Frankfurt Galaxy (2007)
- * Offseason or practice squad member only

Awards and highlights
- First-team All-WAC (2005); First-team All-Sun Belt (2004)

James Allen Cottrell (born January 13, 1983) is an American former football linebacker. He played college football at New Mexico State and was signed by the Baltimore Ravens as an undrafted free agent in 2006.

== Early life ==
Born the son of Jim Cottrell and Tammi Hausmen Jimmy attended and played at Douglas County High School in Castle Rock, Colorado. Jimmy was named to the All-State and All-Colorado teams by both the Rocky Mtn. News and the Denver Post, as well as Conference Defensive MVP his senior season. He was named 1st Team All-Conference at linebacker during his Junior and Senior seasons, as well as 2nd Team All-Conference running back as a senior. Jimmy also wrestled for the Huskies, earning All-Conference honors as a Junior and Senior, and placed in the state tournament as a senior. Jimmy also earned a letter in baseball during his high school sports career.

== College career ==
Jimmy played college football at New Mexico State University where he became the only player in school history to lead the team in tackles for 4 years. Jimmy started 45 of 46 games at middle linebacker for the Aggies during his college career. He racked up 463 total tackles, which places him 3rd all-time in school history, and he led the team in tackles all 4 of his playing seasons. Jimmy lead the nation in tackles as a senior with 179 total stops. Jimmy was named Honorable Mention All-Sun Belt Conference as a sophomore, 1st Team All-Sun Belt Conference as Junior, and 1st Team All-Western Athletic Conference as a senior, as well as being named Honorable Mention All-American as a senior.

== Professional career ==
Jimmy Cottrell signed as a free agent with the Baltimore Ravens in 2006, and spent the 2006 NFL season on the Raven's practice squad. Following the 2006 season he was allocated to the Frankfurt Galaxy of NFL Europe during the spring of 2007. During the 2007 NFL Europe season he suffered a serious shoulder injury. Jimmy spent all of the 2007 NFL season on the Baltimore Raven's Injured Reserve.

== Kiowa Schools ==
From 2019 to 2021, Jimmy served as the Athletic Director and a Football Coach for Kiowa Schools, in his most recent season the Kiowa Indians went 1-3 for the season because of COVID.

== See also ==
- List of NCAA major college football yearly tackles leaders
