= Daniel C. Oakes High School =

Location
- 961 S Plum Creek Blvd; Castle Rock, Colorado 80104; United States
- Coordinates: 39°21′40″N 104°51′33″W

Information
- Type: Public school
- School district: Douglas County School District RE-1
- CEEB code: 060224
- Principal: Brian Singleton
- Staff: 11.69 (FTE)
- Grades: 9-12
- Enrollment: 141 (2023–2024)
- Student to teacher ratio: 12.06
- Language: English
- Website: dcohs.dcsdk12.org

Daniel C. Oakes High School is a public school located in Castle Rock, Colorado. The school is a part of Douglas County School District RE-1. It has 161 students and has courses from grades 9–12.

The school was founded in the year 1986. Brain Singleton is the principal of the school.
