= Bryan King (baseball) =

American baseball player (born 1996)

Houston Astros – No. 74
- Pitcher
- Born: November 5, 1996 (age 29); Littleton, Colorado, U.S.
- Bats: Right Throws: Left

MLB debut
- June 23, 2024, for the Houston Astros

MLB statistics (through September 20, 2026)
- Win–loss record: 9–10
- Earned run average: 3.71
- Strikeouts: 147
- Stats at Baseball Reference

Teams
- Houston Astros (2024–present)

Bryan Dalton King (born November 5, 1996) is an American professional baseball pitcher for the Houston Astros of Major League Baseball (MLB). He made his MLB debut in 2024.

== Amateur career ==
King attended Ponderosa High School in Parker, Colorado, and played for the school's baseball team.

He enrolled at McNeese State University, where he played college baseball for the McNeese Cowboys. In 2016, he played collegiate summer baseball with the Brewster Whitecaps of the Cape Cod Baseball League.

== Professional career ==
=== Chicago Cubs ===
The Chicago Cubs selected King in the 30th round, with the 912th overall selection, of the 2019 MLB draft. He split his first professional season between the rookie–level Arizona League Cubs and Low–A Eugene Emeralds, accumulating a 1.88 ERA in 14 total appearances. King did not play in a game in 2020 due to the cancellation of the minor league season because of the COVID-19 pandemic.

King returned to action in 2021 with the High–A South Bend Cubs and Double–A Tennessee Smokies. In 23 appearances split between the two affiliates, he compiled a 4.53 ERA with 42 strikeouts across 43 2/3 innings pitched. King split the 2022 season between the Single–A Myrtle Beach Pelicans and Tennessee. In 14 appearances out of the bullpen, he recorded a 1.61 ERA with 22 strikeouts and 3 saves. King underwent Tommy John surgery in July 2022, causing him to miss the remainder of the year, as well as ruling him out for the entirety of the 2023 season.

=== Houston Astros ===
On December 7, 2022, the Houston Astros selected King from the Cubs in the minor league phase of the Rule 5 draft. King made his return from surgery in 2024 with the Triple–A Sugar Land Space Cowboys, registering a 1.87 ERA with 41 strikeouts and 3 saves over 31 contests.

On June 22, 2024, King was selected to the 40-man roster and promoted to the major leagues for the first time. He made his major league debut the next day against the Baltimore Orioles, tossing a scoreless inning of relief. King obtained his first major league victory on July 5, 2024, when he worked the fifth inning during a 13–12 triumph over the Minnesota Twnins. King surrendered one run on two hits and one walk.

In 2025, King ranked fourth in the American League (AL) with 27 holds. In 68 games, King finished 11 and collected two saves, and had a 5–4 record with a 2.78 earned run average (ERA), 60 hits, 11 walks, 10 home runs, 69 strikeouts, and 1.044 walks plus hits per inning pitched (WHIP) in 68 innings pitched.

On May 15, 2026, King earned the save by combining with Spencer Arrighetti for a one-hit, 2–0, shutout of the Texas Rangers.

== See also ==
- Rule 5 draft results
