= Brooks Wallace Award =

Collegiate baseball award

- Logo for the Brooks Wallace Award
- Awarded for: Best shortstop in college baseball
- Country: United States
- Presented by: College Baseball Foundation

History
- First award: 2004
- Most recent: Dylan Carey, Nebraska
- Website: Brooks Wallace Award

The Brooks Wallace Award is an award given by the College Baseball Foundation (CBF) to the best college baseball shortstop of the year. The award has been given annually since 2004. Until 2008 the award was presented to the nation's most outstanding player; however, in 2009 the recipient list was changed to only include shortstops. It is named after former Texas Tech shortstop and assistant coach Brooks Wallace, who died of cancer in 1985 at the age of 27.

== Winners ==
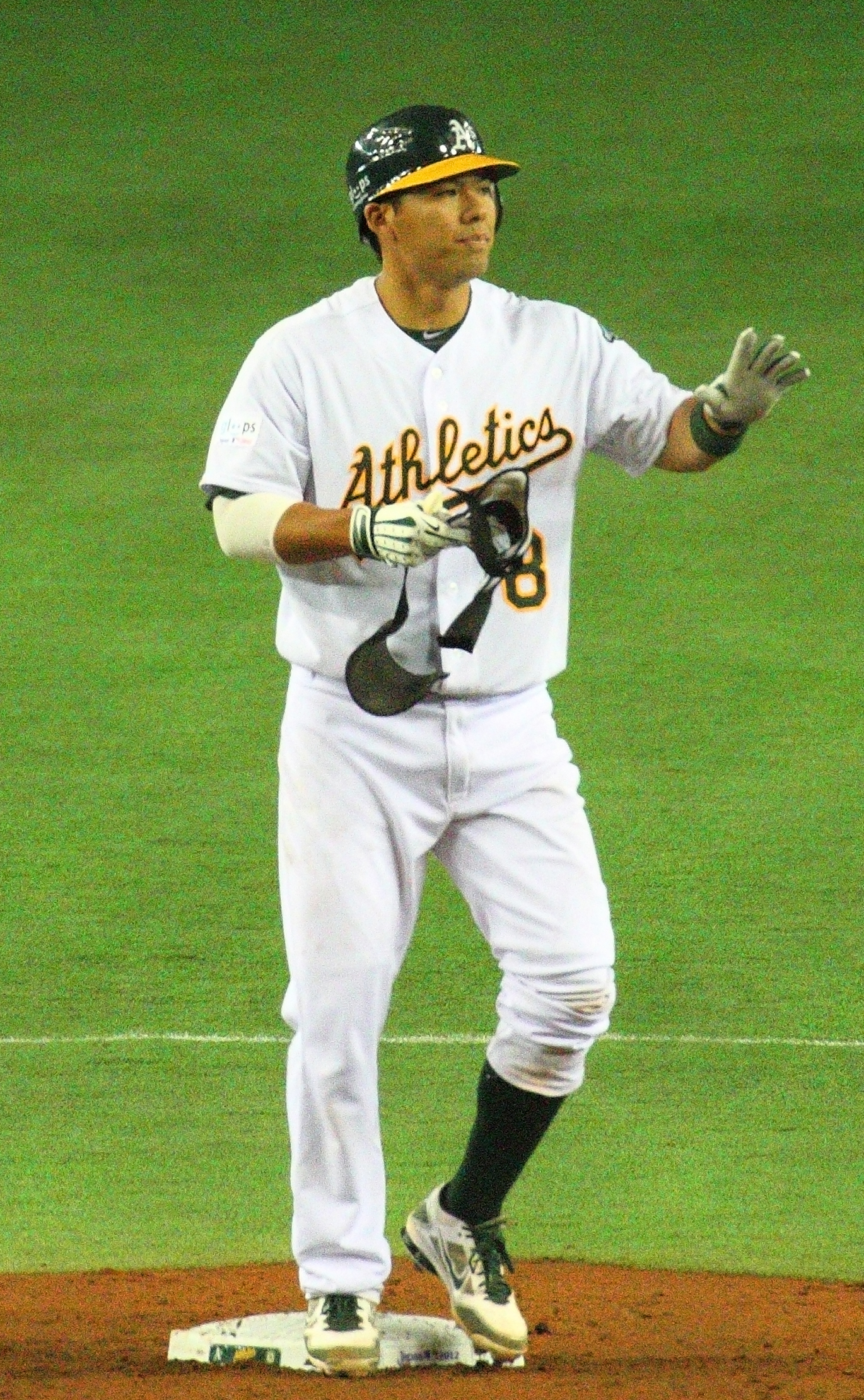
Kurt Suzuki won the inaugural Brooks Wallace Award

Key
Year	Links to the article about the corresponding baseball year
Player	Name of the player
Position	The player's position at the time he won the award (Note: This does not necessarily reflect the player's future position at Major League level. For example, Alex Gordon was originally a third baseman, but subsequently moved to left field in 2010.)
School	The player's college when he won the award
Class	The player's year in college when he won the award
Italics	Player was the first overall MLB draft pick in the same year
^	Player won the Rookie of the Year Award (Note: Won either in the same year or several years later.)
§	Player also won the Golden Spikes Award, Dick Howser Trophy, and/or Johnny Bench Award in the same year

Winners
Year	Player	Position	School	Class	Ref
2004	Kurt Suzuki^{§}	C	Cal State Fullerton	Junior	
2005	Alex Gordon^{§}	3B	Nebraska	Junior	
2006	Brad Lincoln^{§}	P	Houston	Junior	
2007	David Price^{§}	P	Vanderbilt	Junior	
2008	Buster Posey^{§}^{^}	C	Florida State	Junior	
2009	Ben Orloff	SS	UC Irvine	Senior	
2010	Jedd Gyorko	SS	West Virginia	Junior	
2011	Brad Miller	SS	Clemson	Junior	
2012	Zach Vincej	SS	Pepperdine	Junior	
2013	Alex Bregman	SS	LSU	Freshman	
2014	Trea Turner	SS	North Carolina State	Junior	
2015	Dansby Swanson	SS	Vanderbilt	Junior	
2016	Sheldon Neuse	SS	Oklahoma	Junior	
2017	Logan Warmoth	SS	North Carolina	Junior	
2018	Cadyn Grenier	SS	Oregon State	Junior	
2019	Grae Kessinger	SS	Ole Miss	Junior	
2021	Cal Conley	SS	Texas Tech	Freshman	
2022	Brooks Lee	SS	Cal Poly	Sophomore	
2023	Matt Shaw	SS	Maryland	Junior	
2024	Griff O'Ferrall	SS	Virginia	Junior	
2025	Roch Cholowsky	SS	UCLA	Sophomore	
2026	Dylan Carey	SS	Nebraska	Senior	

== See also ==
- List of college baseball awards
- Baseball awards#U.S. college baseball
- College Baseball Hall of Fame
