= Jesse Nading =

American football player (born 1985)

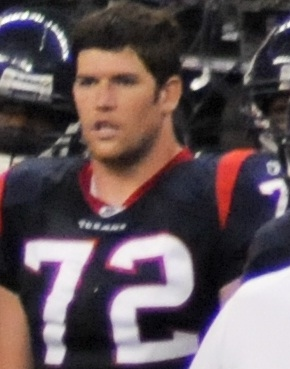
- Nading in 2010

No. 72, 57
- Position: Linebacker

Personal information
- Born: July 3, 1985 (age 41); St. Paul, Minnesota, U.S.
- Listed height: 6 ft 5 in (1.96 m)
- Listed weight: 257 lb (117 kg)

Career information
- High school: ThunderRidge (Highlands Ranch, Colorado)
- College: Colorado State
- NFL draft: 2008: undrafted

Career history

Playing
- Houston Texans (2008−2012)

Operations
- Denver Broncos (2022−present) Senior vice president of strategy & business intelligence

Awards and highlights
- Second-team All-MW (2007)

Career NFL statistics
- Total tackles: 40
- Sacks: 1
- Forced fumbles: 2
- Stats at Pro Football Reference

Jesse Lawrence Nading (born July 3, 1985) is an American former professional football linebacker who is currently the senior vice president of strategy & business intelligence for the Denver Broncos of the National Football League (NFL). He was signed by the Houston Texans as an undrafted free agent in 2008. He played college football at Colorado State.

== Early life ==
At ThunderRidge High School, Highlands Ranch, Colorado, Nading was named the state's Class 4A Defensive Player of the Year in 2002. He was a two-time All-State football selection, also was chosen to All-State basketball and baseball teams in 2002. He was named to the All-Colorado football team in 2002 and was chosen by the Denver Post as the state's Defensive Player of the Year. He helped ThunderRidge to 2002 and 2003 state basketball titles in Class 5A, and was twice named to the state all-tournament team. He led ThunderRidge to 2001 state 4A football championship and holds school record for quarterback sacks in a season, 18. He also excelled in baseball at ThunderRidge.

== College career ==
In 2007, he started all 12 games at defensive end, collecting 56 tackles (19 solo), 6½ tackles for loss, 3½ sacks, one interception, one pass breakup and three fumble recoveries and with second-team all-conference honors. In 2006 as a junior he started at defensive end in 11 of the team's 12 games and made 33 tackles (2 for a loss) ½ a sack and 2 passes broken up. In 2005, he was named honorable mention all-conference and finished season with 56 tackles, 11 tackles for loss and four sacks and one intercepted pass and a forced fumble. In 2004, he started at defensive end in the first three games. In 2003, he redshirted.

== Professional career ==
Nading measured 6-4½, 254 pounds at his CSU Pro Day. He had a 4.75 40-yard dash and a vertical leap of 36".

Nading was signed by the Houston Texans as an undrafted free agent on May 9, 2008. He was waived on August 30 and signed to the team's practice squad on September 1. He was promoted to the active roster on November 19, 2008, and played in six games for the Texans on special teams and defensive end during the 2008 season, totaling four solo tackles and two assisted tackles.

Nading was waived on September 5, 2009 but re-signed to the practice squad two days later. He was promoted to the active roster on November 4 and played in one game in 2009, recording no statistics. He was waived by the Texans on November 17, 2009 and re-signed to the practice squad two days later.

Nading signed a reserve/future contract with the on January 4, 2010. He appeared in five games during the 2010 season, recording five solo tackles, five assisted tackles, 0.5 sacks and one pass breakup, before being placed on injured reserve on December 7, 2010.

He was waived by the Texans on September 5, 2011 and re-signed to the practice squad on September 7. He was promoted to the active roster on October 12, 2011, and played in 11 games in 2011, totaling nine solo tackles, two assisted tackles, 0.5 sacks, two forced fumbles, one fumble recovery.

Nading appeared in all 16 games for the Texans during the 2012 season, accumulating 10 solo tackles and three assisted tackles. He was a special teamer for the majority of his career, playing 357 snaps on special teams and 22 snaps on defense in 2012.

== Post-playing career ==
On December 2, 2022, Nading was named the senior vice president of strategy & business intelligence for the Denver Broncos.
