= Dylan Carey =

American baseball player (born 2003)

New York Mets
- Shortstop
- Born: July 26, 2003 (age 23); Danbury, Connecticut, U.S.
- Bats: Right Throws: Right

Career highlights and awards
- Brooks Wallace Award (2026)

Dylan Jacob Carey (born July 26, 2003) is an American professional baseball shortstop in the New York Mets organization. He played college baseball for the Nebraska Cornhuskers.

== Amateur career ==
Carey attended Ponderosa High School, where he played baseball. In his junior year at Ponderosa, Carey hit .517 with five home runs and 21 RBIs, helping Ponderosa win the state championship in baseball. The following year, Carey hit .527 with 53 RBIs, was named the CHSAA 4A Player of the Year, and aided Ponderosa in winning their second consecutive state championship. As a result, Carey was named the number one high school baseball recruit in Colorado by Prep Baseball Report.

After high school, Carey committed to play college baseball at the University of Nebraska. During the summer before his freshman year, Carey played summer collegiate baseball for the St. Joseph Mustangs of the M.I.N.K. Collegiate Baseball League. Carey made his debut for Nebraska in their opening series against San Diego, averaging .471 along with hitting his first two collegiate home runs. On March 4, Carey had a season-high 4 hits in a win against Hawaii. On the season, Carey averaged .275 with a .348 OBP, 30 RBIs, and four home runs. Following his freshman year, Carey played summer baseball with the Traverse City Pit Spitters of the Northwoods League.

In his sophomore season, Carey averaged .255 with a .326 OBP, 31 RBIs, and seven home runs. Following the year, Carey played summer baseball for the Falmouth Commodores of the Cape Cod Baseball League.

On March 19, 2025, in his junior year, Carey had his first multi-home run game with two in a win against Pepperdine. During the year, Carey was named to the Brooks Wallace Award watchlist. Carey finished the year averaging .288 with a .377 OBP, 41 RBIs, and eight home runs. After going unselected in the 2025 Major League Baseball draft, Carey opted to return to Nebraska for his senior year.

On February 22, 2026, Carey set a collegiate career-high for RBIs in a game, earning five off of three hits in a win against Florida State. Later, on March 4, Carey registered his collegiate career-high for hits in a game, going 5-for-5 in a win against South Dakota State. In the series finale against Indiana on March 29, Carey hit his 57th double, breaking the record held by his head coach, Will Bolt, for the most doubles in Nebraska history. During the year, Carey was named as a semifinalist for the Dick Howser Trophy. At the end of the season, Carey averaged .353 with a .428 OBP, 65 RBIs, and 15 home runs. As a result of his performance, Carey was selected for the first-team All-Big Ten team and was named the Big Ten Defensive Player of the Year. Additionally, Carey received the Brooks Wallace Award and was named on the College Baseball Foundation All-America team.

== Professional career ==
After going undrafted in the 2026 Major League Baseball draft, Carey signed a free agent deal with the New York Mets on July 13. On July 28, Carey was assigned to the Single-A St. Lucie Mets.
