= Douglas County School District (Colorado) =

School district in Colorado, United States

Douglas County School District Re. 1

Address
- 620 Wilcox Street Castle Rock, Colorado, 80104; United States
- Coordinates: 39°22′33″N 104°51′34″W

District information
- Motto: Learn today. Lead tomorrow.
- Established: 1958; 68 years ago
- Superintendent: Erin Kane
- School board: Clark Callahan, Kelly Denzler, Brad Geiger, Susan Meek, Kyrzia Parker, Tony Ryan, Valerie Thompson
- NCES District ID: 0803450

Students and staff
- Enrollment: 62,979 (2020-2021)
- Student–teacher ratio: 17.19

Other information
- Website: www.dcsdk12.org

Douglas County School District Re. 1 is a school district that serves Douglas County, Colorado. The district was formed in 1958 by the consolidation of 17 smaller school districts, adding the "Re. 1" to its name to note the district's first reorganization.

The district's boundary includes all of Douglas County, as well as a section of Elbert County.

== Schools ==
=== Castle Rock area ===
- Academy Charter School (Charter School)
- American Academy Castle Pines (Charter School)
- Arapahoe Community College Sturm Collaboration Campus
- Aspen View Academy (Charter School)
- Cantril Preschool (Program)
- Castle Rock Elementary School
- Castle Rock Middle School
- Castle View High School
- Cherry Valley Elementary School
- Clear Sky Elementary School
- Daniel C. Oakes High School
- Douglas County High School
- Early Childhood Center South
- eDCSD
- Flagstone Elementary School
- Larkspur Elementary School
- Meadow View Elementary School
- Mesa Middle School
- Renaissance Elementary Magnet School
- Renaissance Secondary (Charter School)
- Rock Ridge Elementary School
- Sage Canyon Elementary School
- Sedalia Elementary School
- Soaring Hawk Elementary School
- South Ridge Elementary School
- World Compass Academy (Charter School)

=== Highlands Ranch area ===
- Arrowwood Elementary School
- Ascent Classical Academy (Charter School)
- Bear Canyon Elementary School
- Ben Franklin Academy (Charter School)
- Buffalo Ridge Elementary School
- Copper Mesa Elementary School
- Cougar Run Elementary School
- Coyote Creek Elementary School
- Cresthill Middle School
- DCS Montessori (Charter School)
- Eagle Academy
- Eagle Ridge Elementary School
- Eldorado Elementary School
- Highlands Ranch High School
- Lone Tree Elementary School
- Mountain Ridge Middle School
- Mountain Peak Elementary
- Mountain Vista High School
- Northridge Elementary School
- Platte River Academy (Charter School)
- Plum Creek Academy
- Ranch View Middle School
- Redstone Elementary School
- Rock Canyon High School
- Rocky Heights Middle School
- Roxborough Primary
- Roxborough Intermediate School
- Saddle Ranch Elementary School
- Sand Creek Elementary School
- SkyView Academy (Charter)
- Silver Spruce Elementary
- STEM School Highlands Ranch (Charter)
- Stone Mountain Elementary School
- ThunderRidge High School
- Timber Trail Elementary School
- Trailblazer Elementary School
- Wildcat Mountain Elementary School

=== Parker Area ===
- American Academy Lincoln Meadows (Charter)
- American Academy Motsenbocker (Charter)
- Challenge To Excellence (Charter)
- Chaparral High School
- Cherokee Trail Elementary School
- Cimarron Middle School
- Frankton Elementary School
- Frontier Valley Elementary School
- Global Village Academy (Charter)
- Gold Rush Elementary School
- Iron Horse Elementary School
- Legacy Point Elementary School
- Legend High School
- Leman Academy of Excellence
- Mammoth Heights Elementary School
- Mountain View Elementary School
- North Star Academy
- Northeast Elementary School
- Parker Core Knowledge
- Parker Performing Arts School
- Pine Grove Elementary School
- Pine Lane Elementary School
- Pioneer Elementary School
- Ponderosa High School
- Prairie Crossing Elementary School
- Sagewood Middle School
- Sierra Middle School

=== High schools ===
- Castle View High School
- Chaparral High School
- Douglas County High School
- Highlands Ranch High School
- Legend High School
- Mountain Vista High School
- Ponderosa High School
- Rock Canyon High School
- ThunderRidge High School

=== Charter schools ===
- Ascent Classical Academy (K-12)
- Academy Charter School (K-8)
- American Academy (K-8)
- Aspen View Academy (K-8)
- Challenge to Excellence Charter School (K-8)
- Core Knowledge Charter School (K-8)
- Colorado Early Colleges (CEC) Castle Rock
- Colorado Early Colleges (CEC) Inverness
- Colorado Early Colleges (CEC) Parker
- DCS Montessori Charter School (P-8)
- North Star Academy (K-8)
- Parker Core Knowledge (K-8)
- Platte River Academy (K-8)
- SkyView Academy (K-12) Highlands Ranch
- STEM School Highlands Ranch (K-12)
- World Compass Academy (P-8)

=== Option schools ===
- Daniel C. Oakes High School
- DC Student Support Center
- Eagle Academy – Night High School (11–12 Grades)
- eDCSD: Online Learning (K-12)
- Expert Technician Academy
- Lone Tree Elementary... A Magnet School (Elem. #49)
- Plum Creek Academy (9-12 SED program)
- Renaissance Expeditionary Magnet (K-6)
- Rocky Mountain School of Expeditionary Learning (K-12)

== See also ==
- Endrew F. v. Douglas County School Dist. RE–1
- List of school districts in Colorado
