= Mike Conneen =

American journalist

Mike Carter-Conneen is a communications strategist and former television journalist. He previously worked as an on-air reporter for WJLA-TV, the Washington, D.C. ABC affiliate, appearing on ABC 7 and its sister station NewsChannel 8.

Carter-Conneen was born in Naperville, Illinois. He attended Highlands Ranch High School and graduated from the University of Colorado at Boulder with a bachelor's degree in broadcast news. He also studied in Spain at the University of Seville.

Carter-Conneen started his career in Denver (KUSA-TV). He has also worked in Flagstaff/Phoenix (KNAZ-TV/KPNX-TV) and Colorado Springs (KXRM-TV).

In 2015 he won a National Capital Chesapeake Bay Chapter Emmy Award for his work as a Multi Media Journalist.
