= Logan Warmoth =

American baseball player (born 1994)

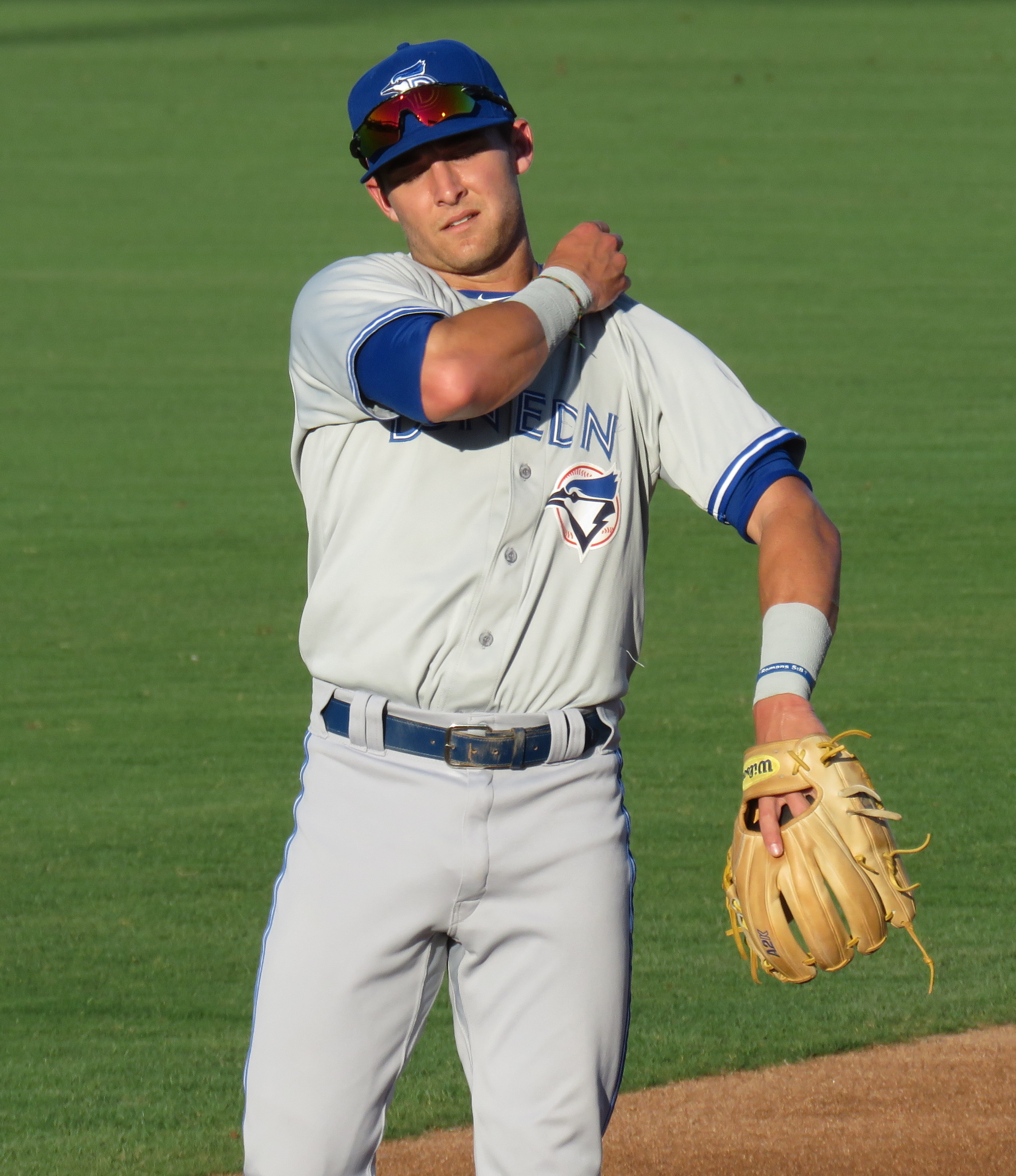
- Warmoth with the Dunedin Blue Jays in 2017
- Third Baseman
- Born: September 6, 1994 (age 31); Orlando, Florida, U.S.
- Bats: Right Throws: Right
- Stats at Baseball Reference

Career highlights and awards
- Brooks Wallace Award (2017)

Logan Brock Warmoth (born September 6, 1995) is an American former professional baseball shortstop. He was drafted in the 1st round of the 2017 MLB draft by the Toronto Blue Jays.

== High school and college ==
Warmoth attended Lake Brantley High School in Altamonte Springs, Florida. In high school, he was ranked as the number-two middle infielder in Florida and the number-six middle infielder nationally by Perfect Game. He also received the Underclass High Honorable Mention from Perfect Game in 2012 and 2013. He committed to the North Carolina Tar Heels over Clemson, Florida State and Stetson in 2014. He played for the Brewster Whitecaps in the Cape Cod Baseball League in the summer of 2016. In his freshman season, Warmoth started all 58 games for the Tar Heels and recorded a .246 batting average, 18 runs batted in (RBI), and 11 stolen bases. As a sophomore, Warmoth hit .337 with four home runs, a team-leading 53 RBI, and eight stolen bases in 53 games played. In 2017, Warmoth led the team with a .336 batting average, .554 slugging percentage, 60 runs scored, 19 doubles, and 10 home runs. Warmoth won the Brooks Wallace Award for the nation's top college shortstop.

== Professional career ==
=== Toronto Blue Jays ===
In the 2017 Major League Baseball draft, Warmoth was selected 22nd overall by the Toronto Blue Jays. Warmoth signed with the Blue Jays on June 28, and received a $2.82 million signing bonus. He was assigned to the Rookie-level Gulf Coast League Blue Jays, and appeared in six games before being promoted to the Low-A Vancouver Canadians of the Northwest League. In total, Warmoth appeared in 45 regular season games and hit .302 with two home runs, 23 RBI, and six stolen bases. In 2018, Warmoth played with the Dunedin Blue Jays where he hit .248 with one home run and 28 RBIs in 75 games.

He split the 2019 season between Dunedin and the Double—A New Hampshire Fisher Cats, slashing .235/.324/.333 with three home runs and 31 RBI over 101 games. Warmoth did not play in a game in 2020 due to the cancellation of the minor league season because of the COVID-19 pandemic. In 2021, he played with the Triple–A Buffalo Bisons where he batted .228 with nine home runs and 41 RBI in 107 games. He played in 90 games for Buffalo in 2022, hitting .229/.325/.375 with seven home runs, 45 RBI, and 14 stolen bases.

=== Seattle Mariners ===
On December 7, 2022, the Seattle Mariners selected Warmoth from the Blue Jays in the minor league phase of the Rule 5 draft. In 107 games for the Double–A Arkansas Travelers, he batted .239/.350/.358 with 8 home runs, 45 RBI, and 28 stolen bases. Warmoth elected free agency following the season on November 6, 2023.

=== Arizona Diamondbacks ===
On March 28, 2024, Warmoth signed a minor league contract with the Arizona Diamondbacks. In 55 games split between the Double–A Amarillo Sod Poodles and Triple–A Reno Aces, he batted a cumulative .182/.317/.229 with one home run, 22 RBI, and seven stolen bases. Warmoth was released by the Diamondbacks organization on July 19.

=== Seattle Mariners (second stint) ===
On July 24, 2024, Warmoth signed a minor league contract with the Seattle Mariners. In 20 appearances for the Triple-A Tacoma Rainiers, he batted .200/.308/.273 with one home run, seven RBI, and three stolen bases. Warmoth elected free agency following the season on November 4.

== Personal life ==
Warmoth grew up in Altamonte Springs, Florida, with his two older brothers, Justin and Tyler. Tyler is a scout for the Seattle Mariners. Justin is a former weekday morning anchor at Orlando CBS-affiliate WKMG. They are the sons of Greg and Christine Warmoth. Greg is the Orlando ABC-affiliate WFTV's weeknight anchor. He married professional golfer Sierra Brooks on October 28, 2023.

== See also ==
- Rule 5 draft results
