= Chaparral High School (Colorado) =

Public high school in Colorado, US

Coordinates: 39°32′23.7″N 104°48′28.16″W

Location
- 15655 Brookstone Drive; Parker, Colorado 80134; United States

Information
- Motto: Take Care of One Another
- Established: 1997 (29 years ago)
- School district: Douglas County School District RE-1
- CEEB code: 061152
- Principal: Greg Gotchey
- Staff: 93.44 (FTE)
- Grades: 9–12
- Enrollment: 2,007 (2024-2025)
- Student to teacher ratio: 21.48
- Colors: Navy, red, white, gold
- Athletics: 5A
- Athletics conference: Continental League
- Mascot: Wolverine
- Website: chs.dcsdk12.org

Chaparral High School, informally known as Chap (/ʃæp/ shap),is a public high school located in Parker, Colorado. It is a part of the Douglas County School District RE-1.

The school is notable in Colorado for how it came to have an automated external defibrillator (AED) unit. Chaparral student Cody Schmidt died in 2003 after his heart stopped while in gym class, spurring his parents to raise funds to acquire AED units for all Douglas County schools.

== Extracurricular activities ==
Chaparral has club sports which have earned state recognition, such as ice hockey, basketball, and volleyball.

Chaparral High School's theatre department was named the number one high school theatre program in the southwest US by Stage Directions magazine in November 2011. Their production of Victor Hugo’s Les Misérables was awarded a total of five Bobby G awards by the Denver Center of the Performing Arts in 2013, including Best Overall Production, Best Direction, Best Musical Direction, and Best Performance by an Actor in a Leading Role.

== Honor societies ==
National Honor Society (NHS) is the largest honor society at Chaparral High School. It was established in 1921. Other honor societies include National Art Honor Society, National Asian Honor Society, Tri-M Music Honor Society and National Hispanic Honor Society.

The National Art Honor Society (NAHS) was founded in 1978 to inspire and recognize scholarship and art in the development of creativity, character, service and leadership. Every September 10–12 grade students who hold a GPA of a 3.0 or higher and have completed two or more art classes are formally invited to apply for membership.

The National Chinese Honor Society was established in 2009 to honor dedicated students of the Chinese language. Chaparral has an active sister school relationship in China with Xinjin Middle School in Chengdu, Sichuan.

== Sports ==
The unified basketball team was organized for the first time at Chaparral High School in winter 2006. The unified soccer team was first organized in the fall of 2007.

== Notable alumni ==
- Josh Adams (born 1993), professional basketball player
- Hayden Dalton (born 1996), basketball player for Hapoel Holon of the Israeli Basketball Premier League
