= ThunderRidge High School =

Public high school in Colorado, US

Location
- 1991 West Wildcat Reserve Parkway; Highlands Ranch, Colorado 80129; United States; 39°32′06″N 105°00′36″W

Information
- Type: Public high school
- Established: 1996 (30 years ago)
- School district: Douglas County School District
- CEEB code: 060746
- Principal: Elizabeth Walhof
- Faculty: 145
- Teaching staff: 88.39 (FTE)
- Grades: 9–12
- Enrollment: 1,820 (2023-2024)
- Student to teacher ratio: 20.83
- Colors: Kelly green and navy blue
- Slogan: Once a Grizzly, Always a Grizzly
- Athletics: 5A
- Mascot: Grizzly bear
- Team name: Grizzlies
- Newspaper: The Growl
- Website: trhs.dcsdk12.org

ThunderRidge High School (TRHS) is an International Baccalaureate public high school in Highlands Ranch, Colorado. It is part of the Douglas County School District. It was established in 1996 and has approximately 1820 students as of August 2025.

== Athletics ==
ThunderRidge High School opened in 1996 and began varsity athletic competition in the 1998–1999 school year. TRHS competes at the 5A level in all athletic sports. ThunderRidge has won 20 state championships in various sports. They have an athletic rivalry with Mountain Vista High School.

=== Basketball ===
The girls' basketball team has won four state championships. In 2003 both the boys' and girls' teams won the state championship at the Pepsi Center in Denver, Colorado. In 2021 and 2022, the boys' team won the state championship.

=== Football ===
The ThunderRidge football competed in 4A football until the 2007 season and now competes in a 5A schedule. They have won three state titles, in 2001, 2004, and 2005.

=== Baseball ===
The ThunderRidge baseball team won their first state championship for 5A in 2004. In 2013 the Grizzlies captured their second state championship with a 2–1 victory over Rocky Mountain High School. Thunder Ridge finished as the only undefeated team in the state tournament that year.

=== Poms ===
The ThunderRidge poms team won the 5A state championship in 2017.

=== Cheer ===
The ThunderRidge Co-Ed cheer team won the 5A state Championships in 2018 and 2019. In 2019 the cheer team won the World Championships in the medium co-ed division.

Field day:

Every year they host field day.

Classes:

They offer many classes including IB and Cte

=== State Championships ===
State Championships
Season	Sport	Number of Championships	Year
Fall	Football	3	2001, 2004, 2005
Winter	Swimming, boys'	1	2010
Winter	Basketball, boys'	4	2002, 2003, 2021, 2022
Winter	Basketball, girls'	4	2003, 2004, 2005, 2016
Winter	Cheerleading, Co-Ed	2	2018, 2019
Spring	Golf, boys'	6	2001, 2002, 2003, 2004, 2005, 2006
Spring	Baseball	2	2004, 2013
Spring	Soccer, girls'	4	1999, 2000, 2002, 2023
Total		24	

== Notable alumni ==
- Matt Bouldin, Israeli Basketball Super League player for the Hapoel Tel Aviv
- Emily Fox, WNBA, played for the Minnesota Lynx
- Jesse Nading, NFL player for the Houston Texans
- Joe Neguse, Representative for Colorado's 2nd congressional district, former University of Colorado Regent
- Derek Tolan, PGA player
- Abby Waner, WNBA, played for the New York Liberty
