= Legend High School =

Public high school in Colorado, US

Location
- 22219 Hilltop Road; Parker, Colorado 80138; United States
- 39°29′36″N 104°44′23″W

Information
- School type: Public secondary
- Motto: Iron Sharpens Iron
- Established: 2008 (18 years ago)
- School district: Douglas County School District RE-1
- CEEB code: 061159
- Principal: Mandi Zimmerman
- Teaching staff: 88.29 (FTE)
- Grades: 9-12
- Enrollment: 1,863 (2023–2024)
- Student to teacher ratio: 21.10
- Colors: Royal blue, white, orange
- Slogan: Find A Way
- Athletics conference: Continental League
- Mascot: Titan
- Website: lhs.dcsdk12.org

Legend High School is a public high school in Parker, Colorado. It is part of the Douglas County School District RE-1.

== Campus ==
Legend High School is located at the northeast corner of the intersection of Hilltop Road and Canterberry Parkway, the entrance to the Parker neighborhood of Idyllwilde. It is an open campus school to freshmen, sophomores, juniors, and seniors. Cimarron Middle School is located adjacent to the Legend High School campus.

== Athletics ==
The varsity athletic programs at Legend include football, basketball, volleyball, wrestling, soccer, lacrosse, baseball, tennis, softball, swim, cheer, poms, gymnastics, golf, track, rugby, and cross country. The school's teams compete in the 5A Continental League of the Colorado High School Athletics Association (CHSAA).

The 2012-2013 basketball team made it to the Final Four in 5A state playoffs, the fastest ascent to the Final Four in Colorado Big School history.

The 2012-2013 baseball team were 5A state runner-ups.

The 2013 rugby team were Division III state champions.

The 2015 and 2018 rugby teams were Division II runner-ups. The 2021 rugby team were Division I runner-ups.

The 2017 softball team won the 5A Colorado high school state championships on the 21st October 2017 against Fossil Ridge, winning 9-3. This was the first time a Legend team won a state championship.

The 2018 softball team won the 5A Colorado high school state championships on the 20th October 2018 against Cherokee Trail, winning 8-4, claiming the school's second state championship.

The 2020 Football team made it to the final four defeating no.6 Fairview 56-35 in the state quarterfinals. Legend junior Bryce Vaz recorded 335 yards and 6 touchdowns in his first start in the win. Senior Jaxon Muma led the state with 7 interceptions on the season. Titans finish 7-1, 7th in state rankings and 4th in 5A both the highest in school history.

The 2021 Football team made it to their second final four in as many years. Defeating notable opponents such as no.4 Regis Jesuit and no.8 Arapahoe. Titans offense record 4500 total yards and 462 points the 2nd most in 5A. Senior Nate Smith recorded a 5A leading 7 interceptions on the year marking the second straight year legend had the most impressive ballhawk. Legend finishes 11-2 3rd in State rankings and 3rd in 5A Rankings.

== EDGE Program ==
The Legend High School EDGE Program is a non traditional education pathway offered to students of Legend High School in Parker, Colorado. Consisting of project based learning, students in the program create interdisciplinary projects each academic quarter and present them to parents and community members for feedback, Students are also able to pursue hobbies, passions, and possible future careers as they build projects, and are frequently required to travel outside the classroom for real world experiences. This program is much like the Montessori program it focuses on project-based learning and prepares students for the real world.

== Legend TSA ==
Legend High School currently Participates in the Technology Student Association and competes annually in district, state, and national competitions. In 2018, 12 events from Legend placed in State competitions, with one event, Software Development, placing 9th at the nationals level in Atlanta, Georgia.

== Notable alumni ==
- Bobby Dalbec, baseball player
- Chad Muma, football player
- Derrick White, basketball player
