= Chris Martinez (soccer) =

American soccer player

Personal information
- Date of birth: December 25, 1970 (age 55)
- Place of birth: Parker, Colorado, United States
- Height: 6 ft 2 in (1.88 m)
- Position: Defender

College career
Years	Team	Apps	(Gls)
1989–1992	Clemson Tigers		

Senior career*
Years	Team	Apps	(Gls)
1993–1997	Colorado Foxes		
1994–1996	Wichita Wings (indoor)	79	(27)
1997–2001	Colorado Rapids	108	(0)
1999	→ MLS Pro 40 (loan)	3	(0)

Managerial career
- 2018–2021: Sporting Kansas City II (assistant)
- 2022: Houston Dynamo (assistant)
- * Club domestic league appearances and goals

Chris Martinez is an American retired soccer defender who played professionally in the American Professional Soccer League, National Professional Soccer League and Major League Soccer.

Martinez graduated from Ponderosa High School in Parker, Colorado. He attended Clemson University, where he played on the men's soccer team from 1989 to 1992. In June 1993, he signed with the Colorado Foxes of the American Professional Soccer League and was part of the Foxes championship team. He would play every season until called up to the Colorado Rapids in 1997. In October 1994, he signed with the Wichita Wings of the National Professional Soccer League. Martinez played two winter indoor seasons with the Wings. In June 1997, the Rapids called Martinez up from the Foxes. He remained with the Rapids through the 2001 season.

On 13 January 2022, Martinez joined Houston Dynamo as an assistant coach. After just 29 matches, he was fired on September 5.
