= Douglas County High School (Colorado) =

Public high school in Colorado, US

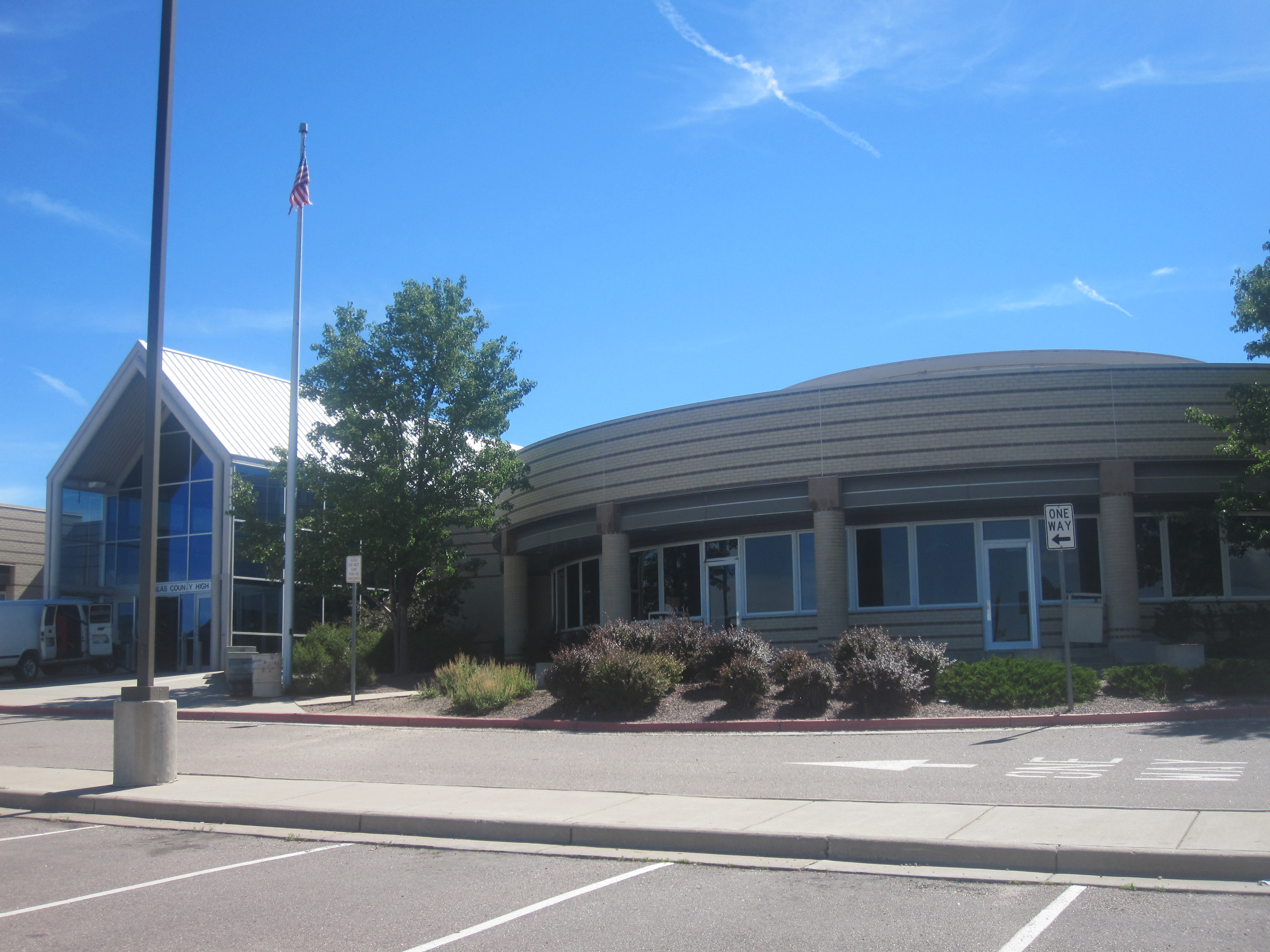
- Front of the school

Location
- 2842 Front Street; Castle Rock, Colorado 80104; United States; 39°23′22″N 104°51′25″W

Information
- School type: Public high school
- Established: 1897 (129 years ago)
- School district: Douglas County RE-1
- CEEB code: 060225
- NCES School ID: 080345000440
- Principal: Jarod Nicholson
- Teaching staff: 85.87 (on an FTE basis)
- Grades: 9–12
- Enrollment: 1,659 (2025-2026)
- Student to teacher ratio: 19.32
- Colors: Purple and white
- Athletics conference: CHSAA
- Mascot: Huskie
- Website: dchs.dcsdk12.org

Douglas County High School, sometimes nicknamed as DCHS and locally identified as DC, is a public high school in Castle Rock, Colorado. It is the oldest school in the Douglas County School District.

== History ==
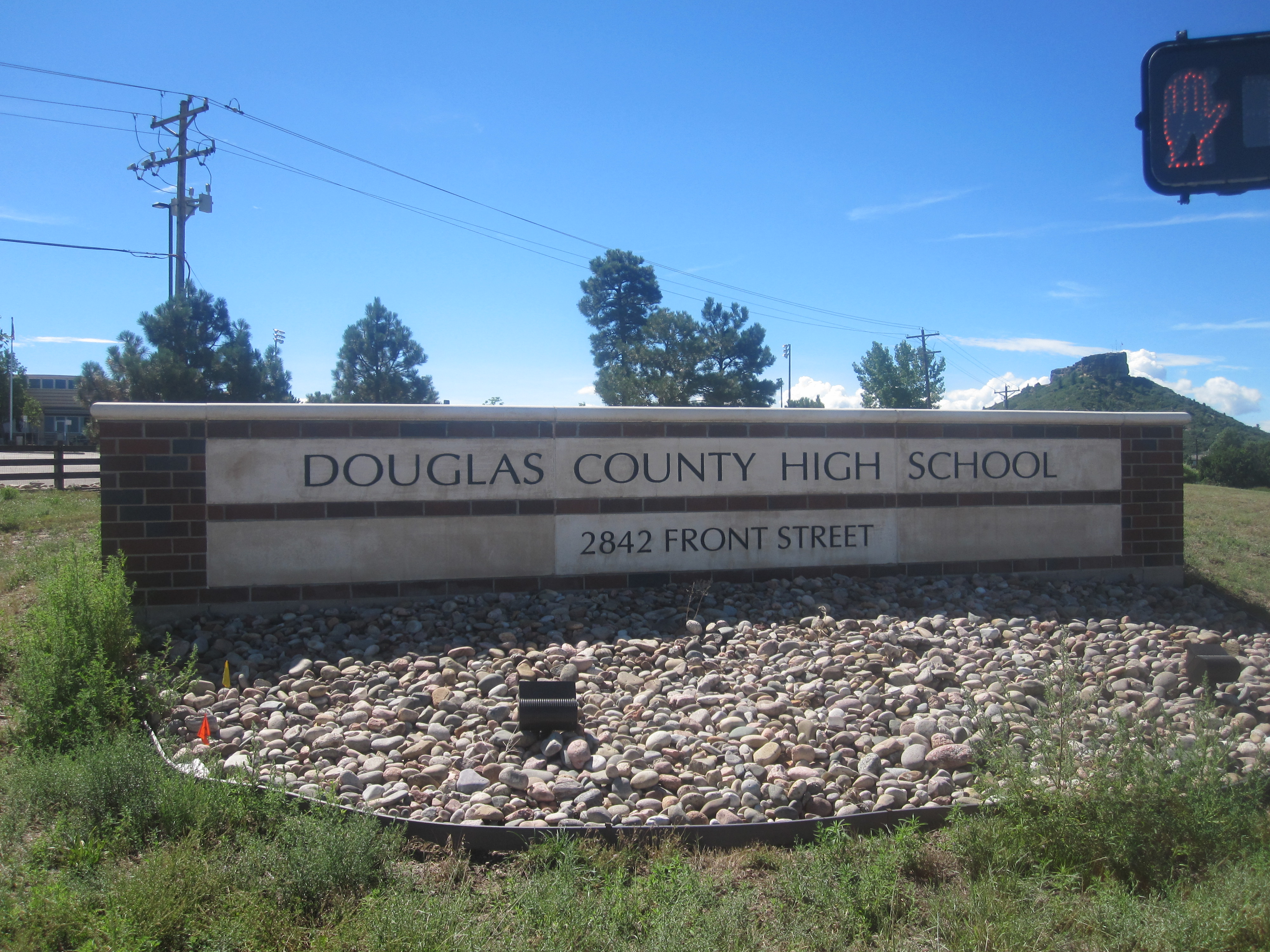
Douglas County High School sign in Castle Rock, Colorado

Elementary through high school classes were held in the Cantril School building in Castle Rock from 1897 through 1907. Douglas County High School was built in the 600 block of Wilcox Street in 1907. The brick building burned down in a 1909 fire and was replaced with a rhyolite building. On May 28, 1937, the building was damaged by a tornado. It was repaired and sees use as a school to this day.

Groundbreaking at the school's current location on Front Street occurred in 1961. The new school location opened in 1962, and fourth through sixth grade students attended classes at the former high school location until Castle Rock Elementary was built in 1983. Castle Rock Junior high (now DCHS South building) was built in 1966.

== Students ==
Demographics:

- 19:1 student-to-staff ratio
- 32% of students are ethnic minorities

== Extracurricular activities ==
=== Sports ===
Douglas County High School teams compete in the 5A class sanctioned by the Colorado High School Activities Association. Teams fielded by the school include baseball, basketball, cross country, football, flag football, golf, gymnastics, lacrosse, soccer, softball, swimming, tennis, track, volleyball and wrestling. Rugby is offered through a cooperative agreement with Castle View High School through a club team named the Castle Rock Pirates. Ice hockey and inline hockey teams are fielded at the club level.

==== State championship titles ====
- 1972: AA Boys' Track and Field
- 1992: 1A-5A Softball
- 1994: 4A Softball
- 2005: 5A Football
- 2007: 5A Inline Hockey
- 2007: 4A-5A Co-Ed Cheerleading
- 2008: 5A Boys' Golf
- 2008: 4A-5A Co-Ed Cheerleading
- 2009: 5A Inline Hockey
- 2009: 5A Boys' Golf Champions
- 2009: 4A-5A Co-Ed Cheerleading
- 2010: 4A-5A Co-Ed Cheerleading
- 2011: 4A-5A Co-Ed Cheerleading
- 2021: 5A Cheer
- 2021: 5A Boys' Volleyball

=== Band ===
The Douglas County High School Marching Band won the state CBA Marching Band Championship in 1995.

== Curriculum ==
Douglas County High School adopted the International Baccalaureate program in 1996. It serves a magnet program within the district. Douglas County High School is one of few IB schools in the world that offers all four sixth subjects of Art, Music, Dance, and Theatre.

== Notable alumni ==
- Amy Adams (class of 1992), actress
- Kirsten Bomblies - MacArthur Fellow and biology professor at Harvard University
- Kat Cammack - United States Representative for Florida's 3rd Congressional District
- Jimmy Cottrell - former NFL linebacker with the Baltimore Ravens
- Aaryn Gries - contestant on Big Brother 15
- Mike Knox – former NFL player
- Beth Malone - Actress- 2015 Tony Nominated for Lead Actress in a musical,"Fun House"
- Dave B. Mitchell - VO actor (DCHS Class of '87)
- Taylor Ritzel - member of the 2012 US women's rowing Olympic team
- Adam Schor – Television producer and showrunner, known for Ready to Love (OWN), The Rap Game (Lifetime), and founder of MoreTV Inc.
