= Rock Canyon High School =

Public high school in Colorado, US

Location
- 5810 McArthur Ranch Road; Highlands Ranch, Colorado 80124; United States
- 39°31′12″N 104°55′17″W

Information
- School type: Comprehensive public high school
- Established: 2003
- School district: Douglas County RE-1
- CEEB code: 060748
- NCES School ID: 080345001961
- Principal: Andy Abner
- Teaching staff: 109.19 (on an FTE basis)
- Grades: 9–12
- Enrollment: 2,328 (2023–2024)
- Student to teacher ratio: 21.32
- Colors: Black and Vegas gold
- Athletics conference: CHSAA
- Mascot: Jaguar
- Website: rockcanyonjags.com

Rock Canyon High School is a public high school in Highlands Ranch, Colorado. Located in the southeast corner of Highlands ranch Colorado, Rock Canyon is located just north of Rocky heights middle school. It is part of Douglas County School District RE-1.

== Notable alumni ==
- Ingrid Andress, country music singer-songwriter.
- Jacob Lissek (born 1992), soccer player.
