= List of Donald Trump 2020 presidential campaign state and territorial political endorsements =

This is a list of notable individual politicians and political organizations who have publicly indicated support for Donald Trump in the 2020 United States presidential election.

== State and territorial executive officials ==
=== Governors ===
==== Current ====
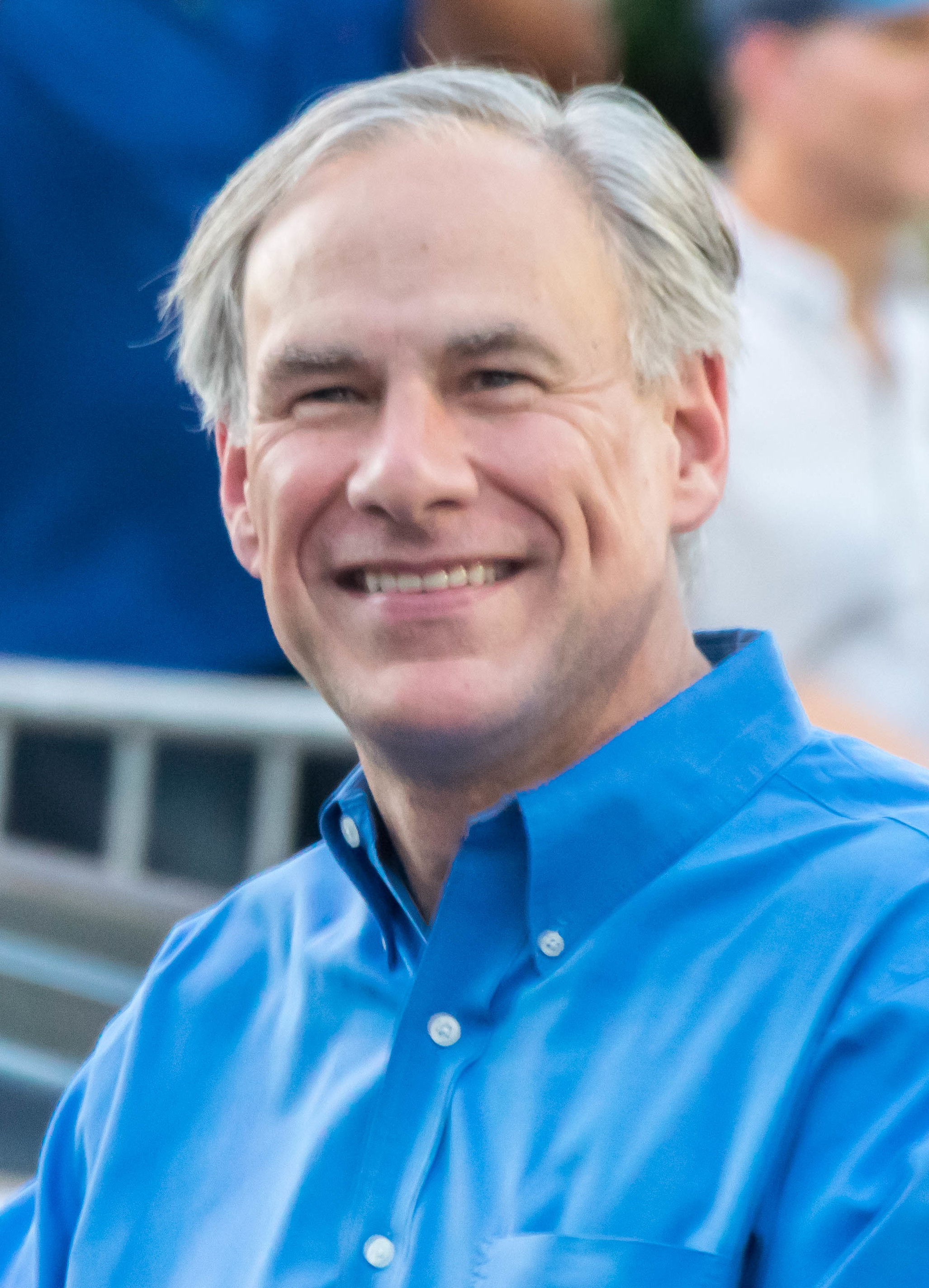
Greg Abbott

- Greg Abbott, Governor of Texas (2015–present)
- Doug Burgum, Governor of North Dakota (2016–present)
- Ron DeSantis, Governor of Florida (2019–present)
- Mike DeWine, Governor of Ohio (2019–present)
- Doug Ducey, Governor of Arizona (2015–present)
- Mike Dunleavy, Governor of Alaska (2018–present)
- Wanda Vázquez Garced, Governor of Puerto Rico (2019–2021)
- Mark Gordon, Governor of Wyoming (2019–present)
- Eric Holcomb, Governor of Indiana (2017–present)
- Asa Hutchinson, Governor of Arkansas (2015–present)
- Kay Ivey, Governor of Alabama (2017–present)
- Jim Justice, Governor of West Virginia (2017–present) (Democrat, Republican since 2017)
- Brian Kemp, Governor of Georgia (2019–present)
- Bill Lee, Governor of Tennessee (2019–present)
- Brad Little, Governor of Idaho (2019–present)
- Henry McMaster, Governor of South Carolina (2017–present)
- Alvin Not Afraid Jr., Chairman of the Crow Nation (2016–present) (Governor equivalent)
- Kristi Noem, Governor of South Dakota (2019–present)
- Mike Parson, Governor of Missouri (2018–present)
- Tate Reeves, Governor of Mississippi (2020–present)
- Kim Reynolds, Governor of Iowa (2017–present)
- Pete Ricketts, Governor of Nebraska (2015–present)
- Kevin Stitt, Governor of Oklahoma (2019–present)
- Chris Sununu, Governor of New Hampshire (2017–present)
- Ralph Torres, Governor of the Northern Mariana Islands (2015–present)

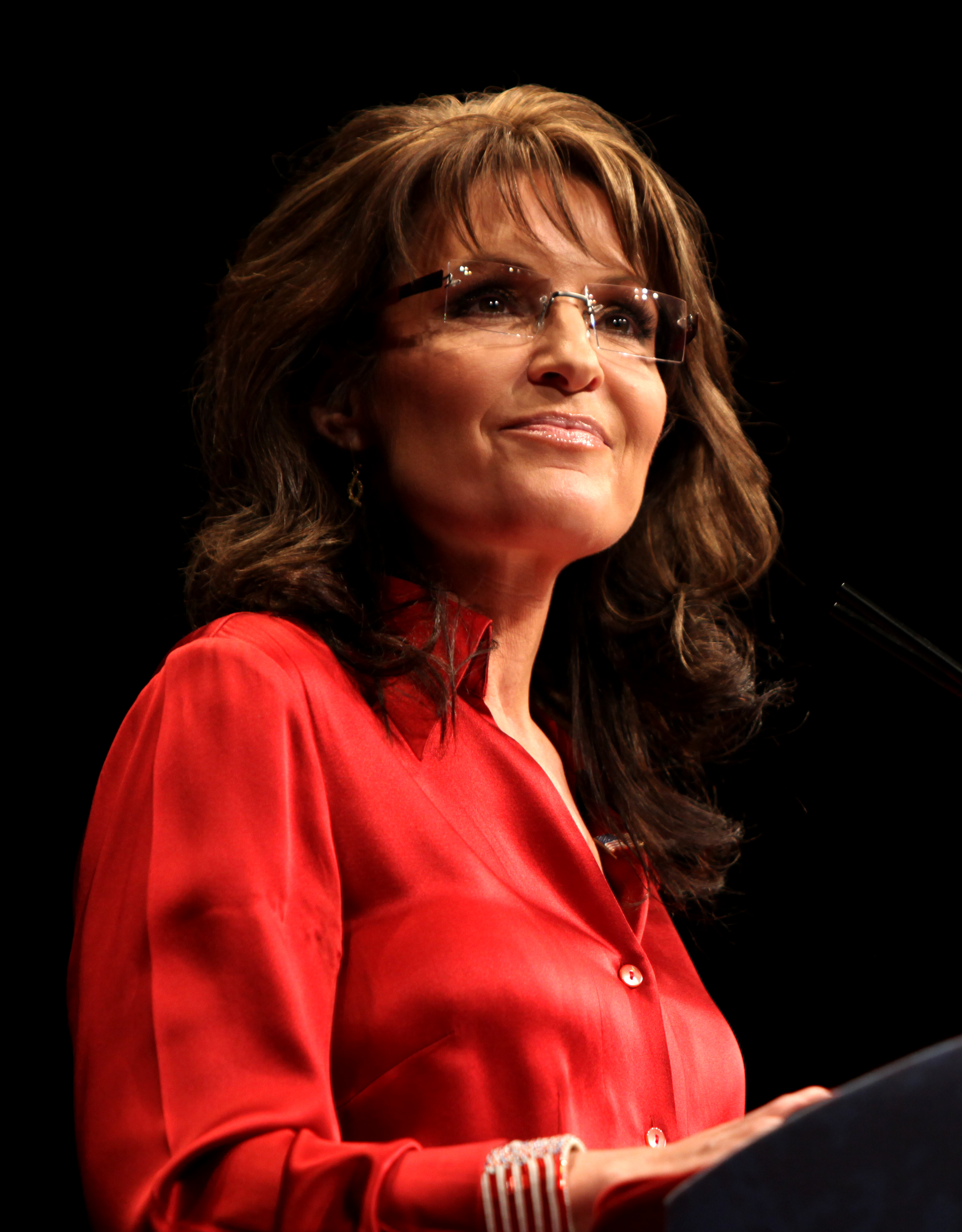
Sarah Palin

==== Former ====
- Haley Barbour, Governor of Mississippi (2004–2012)
- Matt Bevin, Governor of Kentucky (2015–2019)
- Jan Brewer, Governor of Arizona (2009–2015)
- Phil Bryant, Governor of Mississippi (2012–2020)
- Eddie Baza Calvo, Governor of Guam (2011–2019)
- Felix Perez Camacho, Governor of Guam (2003–2011)
- Rod Blagojevich, Governor of Illinois (2003–2009) and U.S. Representative from IL-05 (1997–2003) (Democrat)
- Bill Haslam, Governor of Tennessee (2011–2019)
- Dave Heineman, Governor of Nebraska (2005–2015)
- Gary Herbert, Governor of Utah (2009–2021)
- Mike Huckabee, Governor of Arkansas (1996–2007)
- Paul LePage, Governor of Maine (2011–2019)
- Bob McDonnell, Governor of Virginia (2010–2014)
- Kay Orr, Governor of Nebraska (1987–1991)
- Sarah Palin, Governor of Alaska (2006–2009) and Republican vice presidential nominee in 2008
- Scott Walker, Governor of Wisconsin (2011–2019) and Republican candidate for President in 2016

=== Lieutenant Governors ===
==== Current ====
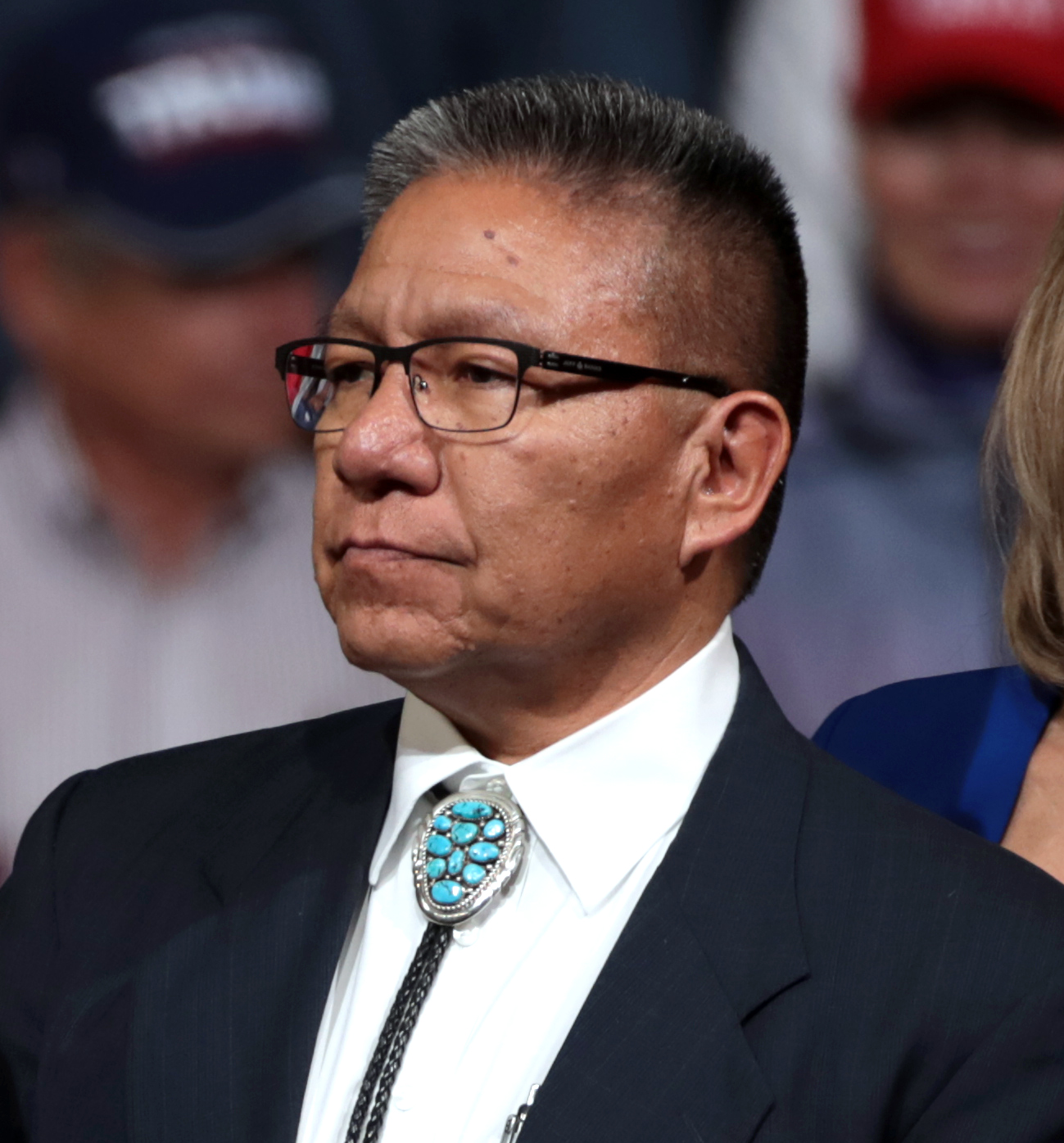
Myron Lizer

- Will Ainsworth, Lieutenant Governor of Alabama (2019–present)
- Mitch Carmichael, President of the West Virginia Senate (2017–present) (Lieutenant Governor-equivalent)
- ~~Spencer Cox, Lieutenant Governor of Utah (2013–2021) and Governor of Utah (2021–present)~~ (Previously endorsed Trump, later stated he did not vote for Trump)
- Geoff Duncan, Lieutenant Governor of Georgia (2019–present)
- Dan Forest, Lieutenant Governor of North Carolina (2013–present) and 2020 nominee for Governor of North Carolina
- Adam Gregg, Lieutenant Governor of Iowa (2017–present)
- Tim Griffin, Lieutenant Governor of Arkansas (2015–present) and U.S. Representative from AR-02 (2011–2015)
- Jon Husted, Lieutenant Governor of Ohio (2019–present)
- Mike Kehoe, Lieutenant Governor of Missouri (2018–present)
- Myron Lizer, Vice President of the Navajo Nation (2019–present) (Lieutenant Governor-equivalent)
- Janice McGeachin, Lieutenant Governor of Idaho (2019–present)
- Randy McNally, Lieutenant Governor of Tennessee (2017–present)
- Jeanette Núñez, Lieutenant Governor of Florida (2019–present)
- Arnold Palacios, Lieutenant Governor of the Northern Mariana Islands (2019–present)
- Dan Patrick, Lieutenant Governor of Texas (2015–present)
- Matt Pinnell, Lieutenant Governor of Oklahoma (2019–present)
- Larry Rhoden, Lieutenant Governor of South Dakota (2019–present)

==== Former ====
- Diego Benavente, Lieutenant Governor of the Northern Mariana Islands (2002–2006)
- Bill Boiling, Lieutenant Governor of Virginia (2010–2014)
- Brian Calley, Lieutenant Governor of Michigan (2011–2019)
- Craig E. Campbell, Lieutenant Governor of Alaska (2009–2010)
- Jennifer Carroll, Lieutenant Governor of Florida (2011–2013)
- Jim Cawley, Lieutenant Governor of Pennsylvania (2011–2015)
- David Dewhurst, Lieutenant Governor of Texas (2003–2015)
- Michelle Fischbach, Lieutenant Governor of Minnesota (2018–2019) and U.S. Representative for MN-07 (2021–present)
- Rebecca Kleefisch, Lieutenant Governor of Wisconsin (2011–2019)
- David Leroy, Lieutenant Governor of Idaho (1983–1987)
- Tracey Mann, Lieutenant Governor of Kansas (2018–2019) and U.S. Representative for KS-01 (2021–present)
- John Sanchez, Lieutenant Governor of New Mexico (2011–2019)
- Evelyn Sanguinetti, Lieutenant Governor of Illinois (2015–2019)
- Mary Taylor, Lieutenant Governor of Ohio (2011–2019)

=== Attorneys General ===
==== Current ====
- Daniel Cameron, Attorney General of Kentucky (2019–present)
- Chris Carr, Attorney General of Georgia (2016–present)
- Lynn Fitch, Attorney General of Mississippi (2020–present)
- Tim Fox, Attorney General of Montana (2013–present)
- Curtis Hill, Attorney General of Indiana (2017–present)
- Jeff Landry, Attorney General of Louisiana (2016–present), and U.S. Representative from LA-03 (2011–2013)
- Steve Marshall, Attorney General of Alabama (2017–present)
- Ashley Moody, Attorney General of Florida (2019–present), Judge of the Thirteenth Judicial Circuit Court of Florida (2007–2017)
- Patrick Morrisey, Attorney General of West Virginia (2013–present)
- Ken Paxton, Attorney General of Texas (2015–present)
- Jason Ravnsborg, Attorney General of South Dakota (2019–present)
- Sean Reyes, Attorney General of Utah (2013–present)
- Leslie Rutledge, Attorney General of Arkansas (2015–present)
- Eric Schmitt, Attorney General of Missouri (2019–present), State Treasurer of Missouri (2017–2019)
- Wayne Stenehjem, Attorney General of North Dakota (2000–present)
- Lawrence Wasden, Attorney General of Idaho (2003–present)
- Alan Wilson, Attorney General of South Carolina (2011–present)
- Dave Yost, Attorney General of Ohio (2019–present)

==== Former ====
- Pam Bondi, Attorney General of Florida (2011–2019)
- Jon Bruning, Attorney General of Nebraska (2003–2015)
- Kevin Clarkson, Attorney General of Alaska (2018–2020)
- Charlie Condon, Attorney General of South Carolina (1995–2003)
- Troy King, Attorney General of Alabama (2004–2011)
- Phillip Kline, Attorney General of Kansas (2003–2007)
- Adam Laxalt, Attorney General of Nevada (2015–2019)
- Don Stenberg, Attorney General of Nebraska (1991–2003)

=== Other statewide elected officials ===
==== Current ====
- Kyle Ardoin, Secretary of State of Louisiana (2018–present)
- Elsie Arntzen, Montana Superintendent of Public Instruction (2017–present), member of the Montana Senate from District 26 (2013–2017)
- Jay Ashcroft, Secretary of State of Missouri (2017–present)
- Gary Black, Agriculture Commissioner of Georgia (2011–present)
- George P. Bush, Land Commissioner of Texas (2015–present)
- Cindy Byrd, Oklahoma State Auditor and Inspector (2019–present)
- Twinkle Andress Cavanaugh, Chair of the Alabama Public Service Commission
- Bev Clarno, Secretary of State of Oregon (2019–present)
- Richard Corcoran, Education Commissioner of Florida (2019–present)
- Lawrence Denney, Secretary of State of Idaho (2015–present)
- Julie Ellsworth, Treasurer of Idaho (2019–present)
- Bob Evnen, Secretary of State of Nebraska (2019–present)
- Keith Faber, Auditor of Ohio (2019–present)
- Scott Fitzpatrick, Treasurer of Missouri (2019–present)
- Andy Gipson, Agriculture and Commerce Commissioner of Mississippi (2018–present)
- Doug Goehring, Agriculture Commissioner of North Dakota (2009–present)
- Mark Hammond, Secretary of State of South Carolina (2003–present)
- Charlie Janssen, Auditor of Nebraska (2015–present)
- John King, Insurance Commissioner of Georgia (2019–present)
- Tommy Land, Land Commissioner of Arkansas (2019–present)
- Andrea Lea, Auditor of Arkansas (2015–present)
- John McMillan, Treasurer of Alabama (2019–present)
- Curt Meier, Treasurer of Wyoming (2019–present)
- John Merrill, Secretary of State of Alabama (2015–present) and member of the Alabama House of Representatives from the District 62 (2010–2014)
- Sid Miller, Agriculture Commissioner of Texas (2015–present)
- Mike Naig, Secretary of Agriculture of Iowa (2018–present)
- Jeremy Oden, member of the Alabama Public Service Commission (2012–present)
- Justin Olson, member of the Arizona Corporation Commission (2017–present)
- Paul Pate, Secretary of State of Iowa (2015–present, 1995–1999)
- Rick Pate, Agriculture Commissioner of Alabama (2019–present)
- Jimmy Patronis, Chief Financial Officer of Florida (2017–present) and member of the Florida House of Representatives from District 6 (2006–2014)
- Dorothy Peranda, Director of the Ohio Department of Agriculture (2019–present)
- Matt Rosendale, Auditor of Montana (2017–present), member of the Montana Senate from District 18 (2013–2017), and U.S. Representative for MT-AL (2021–present)
- John Schroder, Treasurer of Louisiana (2017–present)
- Robert Sprague, Treasurer of Ohio (2019–present) and member of the Ohio House of Representatives from District 83 (2011–2018)
- Corey Stapleton, Secretary of State of Montana (2017–present) member of the Montana Senate from District 27 (2001–2009)
- Eric Skremtta, Louisiana Public Service Commissioner from District 1 (2009–present)
- Steve Troxler, Agriculture Commissioner of North Carolina (2005–present)
- Mac Warner, Secretary of State of West Virginia (2017–present)
- Kimberly Yee, Treasurer of Arizona (2019–present)
- Jim Ziegler, Auditor of Alabama (2015–present)

==== Former ====
- John Barge, Georgia Superintendent of Schools (2011–2015)
- Janet Barresi, Superintendent of Public Instruction of Oklahoma (2011–2015)
- Ken Blackwell, Secretary of State of Ohio (1999–2007), Treasurer of Ohio (1994–1999) and Mayor of Cincinnati, Ohio (1979–1980)
- Patricia Cafferata, Treasurer of Nevada (1983–1987)
- Wesley Craig, Adjutant General of Pennsylvania (2011–2015) and retired U.S. Army major general
- Jeff Dewit, Treasurer of Arizona (2015–2018) and chief financial officer of NASA
- James H. Garner, Adjutant General of Mississippi (1992–2000) and retired U.S. Army major general
- Sheila Harsdorf, Secretary of Agriculture, Trade and Consumer Protection of Wisconsin (2017–2019)
- Mike Huebsch, member of the Wisconsin Public Service Commission (2015–2020)
- Kris Kobach, Secretary of State of Kansas (2011–2019)
- Robert Livingston Jr, Adjutant General of South Carolina (2010–2019) and retired U.S. Army major general
- Terri Lynn Land, Secretary of State of Michigan (2003–2011)
- Jerry E. Patterson, Land Commissioner of Texas (2003–2015)
- Thomas Ravenel, Treasurer of South Carolina (2007) and reality TV personality
- Dan Schwartz, Treasurer of Nevada (2015–2019)
- Edwin Simcox, Secretary of State of Indiana (1978–1986)
- Barry Wong, member of the Arizona Corporation Commission (2006–2007)

== State and territorial judicial officials ==
=== Current ===
- Sharon Kennedy, Associate Justice of the Ohio Supreme Court (2012–present)
- Tom Parker, Chief Justice of the Alabama Supreme Court (2019–present)

=== Former ===
- Cheryl Lynn Allen, Judge of the Superior Court of Pennsylvania (2008–2015)
- John Amari, Judge of the 10th Judicial Circuit Court of Alabama (2009–2019)
- Judith French, Associate Justice of the Ohio Supreme Court (2013–2021)
- Daniel Kelly, Justice of the Wisconsin Supreme Court (2016–2020)

== State and territorial legislators ==
=== State and territorial senators ===
==== Current ====
===== Alabama Senate =====
- J.T. Waggoner, State Senator from District 16 (1990–present)
- Cam Ward, State Senator from District 14 (2010–present)

===== Arizona Senate =====
- Sonny Borrelli, State Senator from District 5 (2017–present)
- Dave Farnsworth, State Senator from District 16 (2013–present)
- David Gowan, State Senator from District 14 (2019–present)
- Sine Kerr, State Senator from District 13 (2018–present)
- Vince Leach, State Senator from District 11 (2019–present)

===== California Senate =====
- Shannon Grove, Minority Leader of the Senate (2019–present) and State Senator from District 16 (2018–present)

===== Colorado Senate =====
- Bob Gardener, State Senator from District 12 (2017–present)
- Dennis Hisey, State Senator from District 2 (2019–present)
- Chris Holbert, Minority Leader of the Senate (2019–present) and State Senator from District 30 (2015–present)
- Vicki Marble, State Senator from District 23 (2013–present)
- Bob Rankin, State Senator from District 9 (2019–present)
- Ray Scott, State Senator from District 7 (2015–present)
- Jim Smallwood, State Senator from District 4 (2017–present)
- Jerry Sonnenberg, State Senator from District 1 (2017–present)
- Rob Woodward, State Senator from District 15 (2019–present)

===== Connecticut Senate =====
- Robert Sampson, State Senator from District 16 (2019–present)

===== Florida Senate =====
- Ben Albritton, State Senator from District 26 (2018–present)
- Doug Broxson, State Senator from District 1 (2016–present)
- Manny Díaz Jr, State Senator from District 36 (2018–present)
- Debbie Mayfield, State Senator from District 17 (2016–present)
- Wilton Simpson, State Senator from District 10 (2012–present) and Majority Leader of the Senate (2016–2018)

===== Georgia Senate =====
- Bill Cowsert, State Senator from District 46 (2007–present)
- Marty Habin, State Senator from District 16 (2016–present)
- Billy Hickman, State Senator from District 4 (2020–present)
- Chuck Hufstetler, State Senator from District 52 (2013–present)
- Burt Jones, State Senator from District 25 (2013–present)
- Chuck Payne, State Senator from District 54 (2017–present)
- Bruce Thompson, State Senator from District 14 (2013–present)

===== Indiana Senate =====
- Ryan Mishler, State Senator from District 9 (2004–present)
- Victoria Spartz, State Senator from District 20 (2017–2021) and U.S. Representative for IN-05 (2021–present)

===== Iowa Senate =====
- Jerry Behn, President pro tempore of the Senate (2017–present) and State Senator from District 24 (2003–present) and District 40 (1997–2003)
- Jim Carlin, State Senator from District 3 (2017–present)
- Randy Feenstra, State Senator from District 2 (2006–present) and U.S. Representative for IA-04 (2021–present)
- Thomas Greene, State Senator from District 44 (2017–present)
- Craig Johnson, State Senator from District 32 (2019–present)
- Carrie Koelker, State Senator from District 29 (2019–present)
- Tim Kraayenbrink, State Senator from District 5 (2015–present)
- Mark Lofgren, State Senator from District 46 (2015–present)
- Tom Shipley, State Senator from District 11 (2015–present)
- Jack Whitver, Majority Leader of the Senate (2018–present) and State Senator from District 19 (2013–present)

===== Kansas Senate =====
- Dan Goddard, State Senator from District 15 (2017–present)

===== Kentucky Senate =====
- Ralph Alvarado, State Senator from District 28 (2015–present)

===== Maryland Senate =====
- Michael Hough, State Senator from District 4 (2015–present)
- J. B. Jennings, State Senator from District 7 (2011–present)
- Justin Ready, State Senator from District 5 (2015–present)
- Johnny Ray Salling, State Senator from District 6 (2015–present)

===== Michigan Senate =====
- Tom Barrett, State Senator from District 24 (2019–present)
- Peter Lucido, State Senator from District 8 (2019–present)
- Mike Shirkey, Majority Leader of the Senate (2019–present) and State Senator from District 16 (2015–present)
- Roger Victory, State Senator from District 30 (2019–present)

===== Minnesota Senate =====
- Justin Eichorn, State Senator from District 5 (2017–present)
- Bill Weber, State Senator from District 22 (2013–present)

===== Missouri Senate =====
- Bob Onder, State Senator from District 2 (2015–present)

===== Montana Senate =====
- Jason Small, State Senator from District 21 (2017–present)

===== Nebraska Legislature =====
- John Arch, State Senator from District 14 (2019–present)
- Lou Ann Linehan, State Senator from District 39 (2017–present)

===== Nevada Senate =====
- James Settelmeyer, Minority Leader of the Senate (2018–present) and State Senator from District 17 (2010–present)

===== New Hampshire Senate =====
- Regina Birdsell, State Senator from District 19 (2014–present)
- Jeb Bradley, Deputy Minority Leader of the Senate (2018–present), State Senator from District 3 (2009–present) and U.S. Representative from NH-01 (2003–2007)

===== New Jersey Senate =====
- Tom Kean Jr, Minority Leader of the Senate (2008–present) and State Senator from District 21 (2003–present)
- Joseph Pennacchio, Minority Whip of the Senate (2017–present) and State Senator from District 26 (2008–present)
- Mike Testa, State Senator from District 1 (2019–present)

===== North Carolina Senate =====
- Phil Berger, President pro tempore of the Senate (2011–present) and State Senator of from district 30 (2019–present), district 26 (2003–2019), district 12 (2001–2003)
- Harry Brown, Majority Leader of the Senate (2011–present) and State Senator from district 6 (2005–present)
- Carl Ford, State Senator from district 33 (2019–present)
- Kathy Harrington, State Senator from district 43 (2011–present)
- Ralph Hise, Deputy President pro tempore of the Senate (2019–present) and State Senator from district 47 (2011–present)
- Vickie Sawyer, State Senator from district 34 (2019–present) and district 44 (2018–2018)

===== North Dakota =====
- Janne Myrdal, State Senator from District 10 (2017–present)
- Dale Patten, State Senator from District 39 (2019–present)

===== Ohio Senate =====
- Theresa Gavarone, State Senator from District 2 (2019–present)
- Frank Hoagland, State Senator from District 30 (2017–present)
- Matt Huffman, Majority Leader of the Senate (2019–present) and State Senator from District 12 (2017–present)
- Steve Huffman, State Senator from District 5 (2019–present)
- Terry Johnson, State Senator from District 14 (2019–present)
- Larry Obhof, President of the Senate (2017–present) and State Senator from District 22 (2011–present)
- Kristina Roegner, State Senator from District 27 (2019–present)

===== Oklahoma Senate =====
- Nathan Dahm, State Senator from District 33 (2012–present)

===== Oregon Senate =====
- Dallas Heard, State Senator from District 1 (2018–present)
- Kim Thatcher, State Senator from District 13 (2015–present)

===== Rhode Island Senate =====
- Dennis Algiere, Minority Leader of the Senate (1997–present) and State Senator from District 38 (2003–present) and District 26 (1993–2003)
- Gordon Rodgers, State Senator from District 21 (2019–present)

===== Pennsylvania Senate =====
- Scott Hutchinson, State Senator from the District 21 (2013–present)
- Kristin Phillips-Hill, State Senator from the District 28 (2019–present)
- Joe Pittman, State Senator from District 41 (2019–present)
- Mike Regan, State Senator from the District 31 (2017–present)
- Judy Ward, State Senator from the District 30 (2019–present)

===== Puerto Rico Senate =====
- Thomas Rivera Schatz, President of the Senate (2009–2013, 2009–present) and State Senator from the at-large district (2009–present)

===== South Carolina Senate =====
- Tom Davis, State Senator from District 46 (2009–present)
- Larry Grooms, State Senator from District 37 (1997–present)
- Katrina Shealy, State Senator from District 23 (2013–present)

===== South Dakota Senate =====
- Jessica Castleberry, State Senator from District 35 (2020–present)
- Reid Holien, State Senator from District 5 (2011–present)

===== Tennessee Senate =====
- Janice Bowling, State Senator from District 16 (2013–present)
- Todd Gardenhire, State Senator from District 10 (2013–present)
- Jack Johnson, Majority Leader of the Senate (2019–present) and State Senator from District 23 (2007–present)
- Bo Watson, State Senator from District 11 (2007–present)

===== Texas Senate =====
- Dawn Buckingham, State Senator from District 24 (2017–present)

===== Utah Senate =====
- J. Stuart Adams, President of the Senate (2019–present) and State Senator District 22 (2009–present)
- Kirk Cullimore, State Senator from District 9 (2019–present)
- Keith Grover, State Senator from District 15 (2018–present)

===== Virginia Senate =====
- Amanda Chase, State Senator from District 11 (2016–present)
- John Cosgrove, State Senator from District 14 (2013–present)
- Jen Kiggans, State Senator from District 7 (2020–present)

===== Washington Senate =====
- Mark Schoesler, Minority Leader of the Senate (2017–present) and State Senator from District 9 (2005–present)

===== West Virginia Senate =====
- Sue Cline, State Senator from District 9 (2016–present)
- Charles Trump, State Senator from District 15 (2014–present)

===== Wisconsin Senate =====
- David Craig, State Senator from District 28 (2017–present)
- Alberta Darling, State Senator from District 8 (1993–present)
- Scott Fitzgerald, Majority Leader of the Senate (2011– 2012, 2013–present), State Senator from the District 13 (1995–present), and U.S. Representative for WI-05 (2021–present)
- Dan Feyen, State Senator from District 18 (2017–present)
- André Jacque, State Senator from District 1 (2019–present)
- Dale Kooyenga, State Senator from District 5 (2019–present)
- Howard Marklein, State Senator from District 17 (2015–present)
- Luther Olsen, State Senator from District 14 (2005–present)
- Patrick Testin, State Senator from District 24 (2017–present)

===== Wyoming Senate =====
- Cheri Steinmetz, State Senator from District 3 (2019–present)

==== Former ====
===== Alaska Senate =====
- Charlie Huggins, President of the Senate (2013–2015) and State Senator from Alaska's D District (2004–2017)

===== Arizona Senate =====
- Carlyle Begay, State Senator from District 7 (2013–2017)
- Russell Pearce, President of the Senate (2011) and State Senator from District 18 (2006–2011)

===== California Senate =====
- Jim Brulte, State Senator from District 31 (1996–2004) and Chair of the California Republican Party (2013–2019)

===== Colorado Senate =====
- Kevin Grantham, President of the Senate (2017–2019) and State Senator from District 2 (2011–2019)
- Ted Harvey, State Senator from District 30 (2007–2015)
- George Rivera, State Senator from District 3 (2013–2015)

===== Georgia Senate =====
- Chip Pearson, State Senator from District 51 (2005–2011)

===== Louisiana Senate =====
- Elbert Guillory, State Senator from District 24 (2009–2016)

===== Maine Senate =====
- Eric Brakey, State Senator from District 20 (2014–2018)
- Phil Harriman, State Senator from District 23 (1992–2000)

===== Michigan Senate =====
- Roger Kahn, State Senator from District 32 (2007–2014)
- Norman Shinkle, State Senator from District 11 (1983–1990)

===== Nebraska Legislature =====
- John Kuehn, State Senator from District 38 (2015–2019)
- Theresa Thibodeau, State Senator from District 6 (2017–2019)

===== Nevada Senate =====
- Sue Lowden, State Senator from Clark 3 District (1993–1997)
- Maurice Washington, State Senator from District 2 (1994–2010)

===== New Hampshire Senate =====
- Daniel Innis, State Senator from District 24 (2016–2018)

===== New York Senate =====
- John DeFrancisco, Deputy Majority Leader of the Senate (2015–2018) and State Senator from District 50 (2003–2018) and District 49 (1993–2002)
- George Maziarz, State Senator from District 62 (1999–2015)

===== North Carolina Senate =====
- Ronald Rabin, State Senator from District 12 (2013–2019)

===== Ohio Senate =====
- Joy Padgett, State Senator from District 20 (2004–2008)

===== Oregon Senate =====
- Cliff Bentz, State Senator from District 30 (2018–2020), State Representative from District 60 (2008–2018), and U.S. Representative for OR-02 (2021–present)

===== Pennsylvania Senate =====
- Scott Wagner, State Senator from District 28 (2014–2018)

===== Wisconsin Senate =====
- Dan Kapanke, State Senator from District 32 (2005–2011)
- Leah Vukmir, State Senator from District 5 (2011–2019)

=== State and territorial representatives ===
==== Current ====
===== Alabama House of Representatives =====
- Jim Carns, State Representative from District 48 (1990–2006, 2012–present)
- Wes Kitchens, State Representative from District 27 (2018–present)
- Arnold Mooney, State Representative from District 43 (2014–present)
- Andrew Sorrell, State Representative from District 3 (2018–present)
- Kyle South, State Representative from District 16 (2015–present)
- Tim Wadsworth, State Representative from District 14 (2014–present)

===== Alaska House of Representatives =====
- Sarah Vance, State Representative from District 31 (2019–present)

===== Arizona House of Representatives =====
- Nancy Barto, State Representative from District 15 (2019–present) and District 7 (2007–2011)
- Walter Blackman, State Representative from District 6 (2019–present)
- Rusty Bowers, Speaker of the House of Representatives (2019–present) and State Representative from District 25 (2015–present)
- Regina Cobb, State Representative from District 5 (2015–present)
- Timothy Dunn, State Representative from District 13 (2018–present)
- Gail Griffin, State Representative from District 14 (2015–present)
- John Kavanagh, State Representative from District 23 (2019–present)
- Joanne Osborne, State Representative from District 13 (2019–present)
- Jeff Weninger, State Representative from District 17 (2015–present)

===== Colorado House of Representatives =====
- Perry Buck, State Representative from District 49 (2013–present)
- Richard Champion, State Representative from District 38 (2020–present)
- Tim Geitner, State Representative from District 19 (2019–present)
- Richard Holtorf, State Representative from District 64 (2019–present)
- Patrick Neville, State Representative from District 45 (2015–present)
- Dave Williams, State Representative from District 15 (2017–present)

===== Connecticut House of Representatives =====
- Anthony D'Amelio, State Representative from District 70 (1996–present)
- Lezlye Zupkus, State Representative from District 89 (2012–present)

===== Florida House of Representatives =====
- Alex Andrade, State Representative from District 2 (2018–present)
- Nick DiCeglie, State Representative from District 66 (2018–present)
- Byron Donalds, State Representative from District 80 (2016–present) and U.S. Representative for FL-19 (2021–present)
- Brad Drake, State Representative from District 5 (2008–2012, 2014–present)
- Dane Eagle, Majority Leader of the House of Representatives (2018–present) and State Representative from District 77 (2012–present)
- Randy Fine, State Representative from District 53 (2016–present)
- Jason Fischer, State Representative from District 16 (2016–present)
- Tommy Gregory, State Representative from District 73 (2018–present)
- Blaise Ingoglia, State Representative from District 35 (2014–present) and Chair of the Florida Republican Party (2015–2019)
- Fiona McFarland, State Representative from District 72 (2020–present)
- Daniel Perez, State Representative from District 116 (2018–present)
- Mel Ponder, State Representative from District 4 (2016–present)
- Paul Renner, State Representative from District 24 (2015–present)
- Ray Rodrigues, State Representative from District 76 (2012–present) and Majority Leader of the House of Representatives (2016–2018)
- Bob Rommel, State Representative from District 106 (2016–present)
- Anthony Sabatini, State Representative from District 32 (2018–present)
- Jason Shoaf, State Representative from District 7 (2019–present)
- Josie Tomkow, State Representative from District 39 (2018–present)

===== Georgia House of Representatives =====
- Matt Barton, State Representative from District 5 (2019–present)
- Josh Bonner, State Representative from District 72 (2017–present)
- Kevin Cooke, State Representative from District 18 (2011–present)
- Katie Dempsey, State Representative from District 13 (2007–present)
- Houston Gaines, State Representative from District 117 (2019–present)
- Matthew Gambill, State Representative from District 15 (2019–present)
- Rick Jasperse, State Representative from District 11 (2013–present) and District 12 (2010–2013)
- Vernon Jones, State Representative from District 91 (2017–present) and District 71 (1993–2001) (Democrat)
- Trey Kelley, State Representative from District 16 (2013–present)
- Eddie Lumsden, State Representative from District 12 (2013–present)
- Butch Parrish, State Representative from District 158 (1984–present)
- David Ralston, Speaker of the House of Representatives (2020–present) and State Representative from District 7 (2005–present) and District 6 (2003–2005)
- Mitchell Scoggins, State Representative from District 14 (2019–present)
- Ron Stephens, State Representative from District 164 (1994–present)

===== Idaho House of Representatives =====
- Dorothy Moon, State Representative from District 8 Seat B (2016–present)
- Mike Moyle, Majority Leader of the House of Representatives (2006–present) and State Representative from District 14A (1998–present)
- Tammy Nichols, State Representative from District 11 (2018–present)

===== Illinois House of Representatives =====
- Darren Bailey, State Representative from District 109 (2019–present)
- Dan Caulkins, State Representative from District 101 (2019–present)
- Brad Halbrook, State Representative from District 102 (2017–present)
- Chris Miller, State Representative from District 110 (2019–present)
- Allen Skillicorn, State Representative from District 66 (2017–present)
- Blaine Wilhour, State Representative from District 107 (2019–present)

===== Indiana House of Representatives =====
- Beau Baird, State Representative from District 44 (2018–present)
- Peggy Mayfield, State Representative from District 60 (2012–present)
- Curt Nisly, State Representative from District 22 (2014–present)
- Dave Wolkins, State Representative from District 18 (1988–present)

===== Iowa House of Representatives =====
- Gary Carlson, State Representative from District 91 (2015–present)
- Cecil Dolechek, State Representative from District 24 (2013–present), District 96 (2003–2013), District 88 (1997–2003)
- Dean Fisher, State Representative from District 72 (2013–present)
- Thomas Gerhold, State Representative from District 75 (2018–present)
- Pat Grassley, Speaker of the House of Representatives (2017–present) and State Representative from District 50 (2017–present)
- Stan Gustafon, State Representative from District 25 (2014–present)
- Ashley Hinson, State Representative from District 67 (2017–present) and U.S. Representative for IA-01 (2021–present)
- Steven Holt, State Representative from District 18 (2015–present)
- Thomas Jeneary, State Representative from District 5 (2019–present)
- Bobby Kaufmann, State Representative from District 73 (2013–present)
- David Kerr, State Representative from District 88 (2017–present)
- Brian Lohse, State Representative from District 30 (2017–present)
- David Maxwell, State Representative from District 76 (2013–present)
- Joe Mitchell, State Representative from District 84 (2019–present)
- Norlin Mommsen, State Representative from District 97 (2015–present)
- Sandy Salmon, State Representative from District 63 (2013–present)
- David Sieck, State Representative from District 23 (2015–present)
- John Wills, State Representative from District 1 (2015–present)
- Gary Worthan, State Representative from District 11 (2013–present) and District 52 (2007–2013)

===== Kansas House of Representatives =====
- John Barker, State Representative from District 70 (2013–present)
- J.R. Claeys, State Representative from District 69 (2013–present)
- Willie Dove, State Representative from District 38 (2013–present)
- Daniel Hawkins, Majority Leader of the House of Representatives (2019–present) and State Representative from District 100 (2013–present)
- Ronald Highland, State Representative from District 51 (2013–present)
- John Resman, State Representative from District 121 (2017–present)

===== Maine House of Representatives =====
- Susan Austin, State Representative from District 67 (2014–present) and District 109 (2002–2010)
- Kathleen Dillingham, Minority Leader of the House of Representatives (2018–present) and State Representative from District 25 (2014–present)

===== Maryland House of Delegates =====
- Chris Adams, State Delegate from District 37B (2015–present)
- Steven J. Arentz, State Delegate from District 36 (2013–present)
- Lauren Arikan, State Delegate from District 7 (2019–present)
- Wendell R. Beitzel, State Delegate from District 1A (2007–present)
- Joseph C. Boteler III, State Delegate from District 8 (2003–2015, 2019–present)
- Brian Chisholm, State Delegate from District 31B (2019–present)
- Barrie Ciliberti, State Delegate from District 4 (2015–present)
- Dan Cox, State Delegate from District 4 (2019–present)
- Mark N. Fisher, State Delegate from District 27C (2011–present)
- Robin Grammer Jr, State Delegate from District 6 (2015–present)
- Wayne Hartman, State Delegate from District 38C (2019–present)
- Kevin Hornberger, State Delegate from District 35A (2015–present)
- Seth A. Howard, State Delegate from District 30B (2015–present)
- Richard Impallaria, State Delegate from District 7 (2003–present)
- Jay Jacobs, State Delegate from District 36 (2011–present)
- Trent Kittleman, State Delegate from District 9A (2015–present)
- Susan W. Krebs, State Delegate from District 5 (2003–present)
- Robert B. Long, State Delegate from District 6 (2015–present)
- Nino Mangione, State Delegate from District 42B (2019–present)
- Johnny Mautz, State Delegate from District 37B (2015–present)
- Susan K. McComas, State Delegate from District 35B (2003–present)
- Mike McKay, State Delegate from District 1C (2015–present)
- Warren E. Miller, State Delegate from District 9A (2003–present)
- Matthew Morgan, State Delegate from District 29A (2015–present)
- Neil Parrott, State Delegate from District 2A (2011–present) and 2020 Republican Nominee for MD-06
- Jesse Pippy, State Delegate from District 4 (2019–present)
- Teresa E. Reilly, State Delegate from District 35B (2015–present)
- April Rose, State Delegate from District 5 (2015–present)
- Haven Shoemaker, State Delegate from District 5 (2015–present)
- Kathy Szeliga, State Delegate from District 7 (2011–present)
- Brenda J. Thaim, State Delegate from District 2B (2020–present)
- William J. Wivell, State Delegate from District 2A (2015–present)

===== Michigan House of Representatives =====
- Lynn Afendoulis, State Representative from District 73 (2019–present)
- Julie Alexander, State Representative from District 64 (2017–present)
- Joe Bellino, State Representative from District 17 (2017–present)
- Lee Chatfield, Speaker of the House of Representatives (2019–present) and State Representative from District 107 (2015–present)
- Triston Cole, Majority Leader of the House of Representatives (2019–present) and State Representative from District 105 (2015–present)
- Matt Hall, State Representative from District 63 (2019–present)
- Brandt Iden, State Representative from District 61 (2015–present)
- Gregory Markkanen, State Representative from District 110 (2019–present)
- Bradley Slagh, State Representative from District 90 (2019–present)
- Pauline Wendzel, State Representative from District 79 (2017–present)
- Jason Wentworth, Speaker pro tempore of the Michigan House of Representatives (2019–present) and State Representative from District 97 (2017–present)
- Mary Whiteford, State Representative from District 80 (2016–present)

===== Minnesota House of Representatives =====
- Dan Fabian, Minority Whip of the House of Representatives (2019–present) and State Representative from District 1A (2011–present)
- Matt Grossell, State Representative from District 2A (2017–present)
- Bob Gunther, State Representative from District 23A (2013–present), District 24A (2003–2013) and District 26A (1995–2003)
- Jeremy Munson, State Representative from District 23B (2018–present)

===== Missouri House of Representatives =====
- Dan Shaul, State Representative from District 113 (2015–present)

===== Montana House of Representatives =====
- Steve Gunderson, State Representative from District 1 (2017–present)

===== Nevada Assembly =====
- Gregory Hafen II, State Assemblyman from District 36 (2018–present)
- Lisa Krasner, State Assemblyman from District 26 (2016–present)
- Glen Leavitt, State Assemblyman from District 23 (2018–present)
- Robin Titus, Minority Leader of the Assembly (2019–present) and State Assemblyman from District 38 (2014–present)
- Jim Wheeler, State Assemblyman from District 39 (2013–present) and Minority Leader of the Nevada Assembly (2017–2019)

===== New Hampshire House of Representatives =====
- Al Baldasaro, State Representative from the Rockingham 5th District (2006–present)
- Fred Doucette, State Representative from Rockingham 8th District (2014–present)

===== New Jersey General Assembly =====
- Antwan McClellan, State Assemblyman from District 1 (2020–present)
- Gerard Scharfenberger, State Assemblyman from District 13 (2020–present)

===== New Mexico House of Representatives =====
- Alonzo Baldonado, State Representative from District 8 (2011–present)
- Rod Montoya, State Representative from District 1 (2015–present)
- James G. Townsend, State Representative from District 54 (2015–present)

===== New York State Assembly =====
- William Barclay, Minority Leader of the State Assembly (2020–present) and State Assemblyman from District 120 (2003–present)
- Nicole Malliotakis, State Assemblyman from District 64 (2013–present) and District 60 (2011–2012) and U.S. Representative for NY-11 (2021–present)

===== North Carolina House of Representatives =====
- John R. Bell IV, Majority Leader of the House of Representatives (2016–present) and State Representative from District 10 (2013–present)
- Frank Iler, State Representative from District 17 (2009–present)
- Brenden Jones, State Representative from District 46 (2017–present)
- Keith Kidwell, State Representative from District 79 (2019–present)
- Tim Moore, Speaker of the House of Representatives (2015–present) and State Representative from District 111 (2003–present)
- Phil Shepard, State Representative from District 15 (2011–present)
- Michael Speciale, State Representative from District 3 (2013–present)
- Sarah Stevens, State Representative from District 90 (2009–present)
- Holly Grange, State Representative from District 20 (2016–present)

===== North Dakota House of Representatives =====
- Rick Becker, State Representative from District 7 (2012–present)
- Craig Headland, State Representative from District 29 (2002–present)
- Scott Louser, State Representative from District 5 (2010–present)
- Michael Nathe, State Representative from District 30 (2008–present)

===== Northern Mariana Islands House of Representatives =====
- Angel Demapan, State Representative from District 1 (2015–present)

===== Ohio House of Representatives =====
- Cindy Abrams, State Representative from District 29 (2019–present)
- Niraj Antani, State Representative from District 42 (2014–present)
- Sara Carruthers, State Representative from District 51 (2019–present)
- Robert R. Cupp, Speakers of the House of Representatives (2020–present) and State Representative from District 4 (2015–present)
- Haraz Ghanbari, State Representative from District 3 (2019–present)
- Larry Householder, State Representative from District 72 (2017–present, 1997–2004) and Speaker of the House of Representatives (2019–2020, 2001–2004)
- Kris Jordan, State Representative from District 67 (2019–present)
- Candice Keller, State Representative from District 53 (2016–present)
- Bernadine Kent, State Representative from District 25 (2017–present) (Democrat)
- George Lang, State Representative from District 52 (2017–present)
- Susan Manchester, State Representative from District 84 (2019–present)
- Rick Perales, State Representative from District 73 (2013–present)
- Phil Plummer, State Representative from District 40 (2019–present)
- Jena Powell, State Representative from District 80 (2019–present)
- Mark Romanchuk, State Representative from District 2 (2013–present)
- D.J. Swearingen, State Representative from District 89 (2019–present)
- Scott Wiggam, State Representative from District 1 (2017–present)

===== Oklahoma House of Representatives =====
- Denise Crosswhite Hader, State Representative from District 41 (2018–present)
- Kevin McDugle, State Representative from District 12 (2016–present)

===== Oregon House of Representatives =====
- Greg Barreto, State Representative from District 58 (2015–present)
- Vikki Breese-Iverson, State Representative from District 55 (2019–present)
- E. Werner Reschke, State Representative from District 56 (2017–present)

===== Pennsylvania House of Representatives =====
- Aaron Bernstine, State Representative from District 10 (2017–present)
- Bob Brooks, State Representative from District 54 (2018–present) and Mayor of Murrysville, Pennsylvania (2010–2018)
- Martin Causer, State Representative from District 67 (2003–present)
- Cris Dush, State Representative from District 66 (2015–present)
- Sue Helm, State Representative from District 104 (2007–present)
- Tim Hennessey, State Representative from District 26 (1992–present)
- Andrew Lewis, State Representative from District 105 (2018–present)
- David H. Zimmerman, State Representative from District 99 (2015–present)

===== Puerto Rico House of Representatives =====
- José Kikito Meléndez, State Representative from the at-large district (2011–present)

===== Rhode Island House of Representatives =====
- Blake Filippi, Minority Leader of the House of Representatives (2018–present) and State Representative from District 36 (2015–present) (co-endorsed with Tulsi Gabbard)
- Robert Nardolillo, State Representative from District 28 (2015–present)
- Brian Newberry, State Representative from District 48 (2009–present)

===== South Carolina House of Representatives =====
- Lin Bennett, State Representative from District 114 (2019–present)
- Micah Caskey, State Representative from District 89 (2017–present)
- Nancy Mace, State Representative from District 99 (2018–present) and U.S. Representative for SC-01 (2021–present)
- Adam Morgan, State Representative from District 20 (2018–present)

===== South Dakota House of Representatives =====
- Scyller Borgum, State Representative from District 32 (2018–present)
- Steven Long, State Representative from District 37 (2016–present)

===== Tennessee House of Representatives =====
- Rusty Grills, State Representative from District 77 (2020–present)
- William Lamberth, Majority Leader of the House of Representatives (2019–present) and State Representative from District 44 (2013–present)
- Iris Rudder, State Representative from District 39 (2018–present)
- Cameron Sexton, Speaker of the House of Representatives (2019–present) and State Representative from District 25 (2011–present)
- Micah Van Huss, State Representative from District 6 (2013–present)
- Ryan Williams, State Representative from District 42 (2011–present)

===== Texas House of Representatives =====
- Trent Ashby, State Representative from District 57 (2013–present)
- Keith Bell, State Representative from District 4 (2018–present)
- Dustin Burrows, Majority Leader of the House of Representatives (2019) and State Representative from District 83 (2015–present)
- Travis Clardy, State Representative from District 11 (2013–present)
- Thomas Craddick, State Representative from District 82 (1993–present), District 76 (1983–1993), District 68 (1973–1983) and District 70 (1969–1973) and Speaker of the House of Representatives (2003–2009)
- Tan Parker, State Representative from District 63 (2007–present) and Majority Leader of the House of Representatives (2015–2018)
- Robin Smith, State Representative from District 26 (2008–present) and Chair of the Tennessee Republican Party (2007–2009)
- James White, State Representative from District 19 (2013–present) and District 12 (2011–2013)

===== Utah House of Representatives =====
- Kim Coleman, State Representative from District 42 (2015–present)

===== Virginia House of Delegates =====
- Ronnie Campbell, State Delegate from District 24 (2019–present)
- Glenn Davis, State Delegate from District 84 (2014–present)
- Nick Freitas, State Delegate from District 30 (2016–present)
- Dave LaRock, State Delegate from District 33 (2014–present)
- John McGuire, State Delegate from District 56 (2018–present)
- Jason Miyares, State Delegate from District 82 (2016–present) and Attorney General of Virginia (2022–present)
- Wendell Walker, State Delegate from District 23 (2020–present)

===== Washington House of Representatives =====
- Matt Boehnke, State Representative from District 8 (2018–present)
- Mary Dye, State Representative from District 9 Position 1 (2015–present)
- Bill Jenkin, State Representative from District 16 Position 1 (2017–present)
- Brad Klippert, State Representative from District 8 (2009–present)
- Skyler Rude, State Representative from District 16 Position 2 (2019–present)
- Joe Schmick, State Representative from District 9 Position 2 (2007–present)
- Jim Walsh, State Representative from District 19 Position 1 (2016–present)

===== West Virginia House of Delegates =====
- Caleb Hanna, State Delegate from District 44 (2018–present)
- Daniel Linville, State Delegate from District 65 (2018–present)
- Rupie Phillips, State Delegate from District 24 (2013–present) and District 19 (2011–2013)

===== Wisconsin State Assembly =====
- Tyler August, Speaker pro tempore of the State Assembly (2013–present) and State Assemblyman from District 32 (2011–present)
- Janel Brandtjen, State Assemblywoman from District 22 (2015–present)
- Rob Hutton, State Assemblyman from District 13 (2013–present)
- Samantha Kerkman, State Assemblywoman from District 61 (2013–present) and District 66 (2001–2013)
- Dan Knodl, State Assemblyman from District 24 (2009–present)
- Mike Kuglitsch, State Assemblyman from District 84 (2011–present)
- Tony Kurtz, State Assemblyman from District 50 (2019–present)
- John Macco, State Assemblyman from District 88 (2015–present)
- Adam Neylon, State Assemblyman from District 98 (2013–present)
- John Nygren, State Assemblyman from District 89 (2007–present)
- Jim Ott, State Assemblyman from District 23 (2007–present)
- Treig Pronschinske, State Assemblyman from District 92 (2017–present)
- Jessie Rodriguez, State Assemblyman from District 21 (2013–present)
- Joe Sanfelippo, State Assemblyman from District 15 (2013–present)
- Ken Skowronski, State Assemblyman from District 82 (2014–present)
- Robin Vos, Speaker of the State Assembly (2013–present) and State Assemblyman from District 63 (2005–present)
- Chuck Wichgers, State Assemblyman from District 83 (2017–present)

==== Former ====
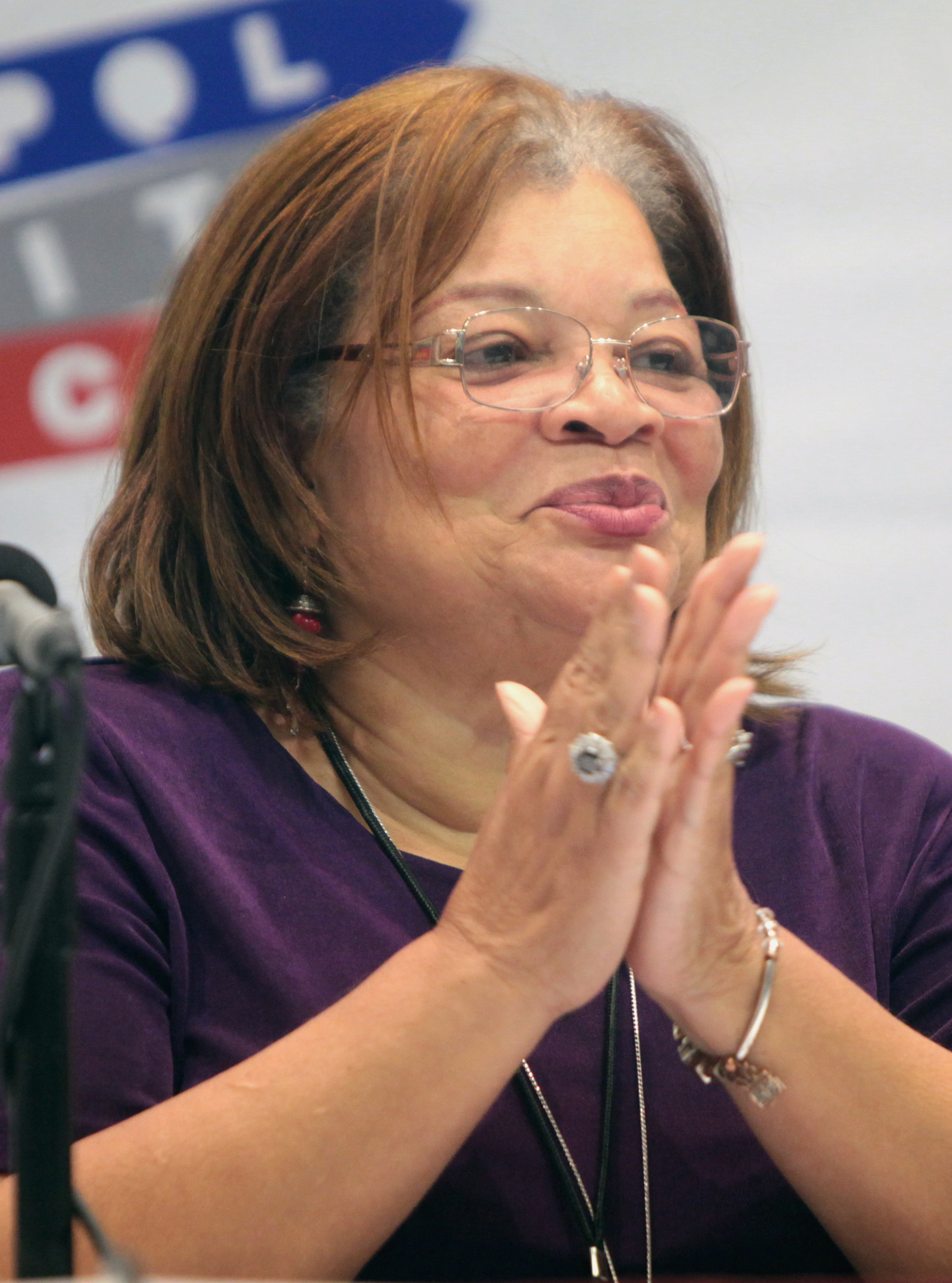
Alveda King

===== Alabama House of Representatives =====
- Mack Butler, State Representative from District 30 (2012–2018)
- Perry Hooper Jr, State Representative from District 73 (1984–2003)
- Barry Moore, State Representative from District 91 (2010–2018) and U.S. Representative for AL-02 (2021–present)
- Jill Norgaard, State Representative from District 18 (2015–2019)

===== Arizona House of Representatives =====
- Brenda Barton, State Representative from District 6 (2013–2019) and District 5 (2011–2013)

===== Arkansas House of Representatives =====
- Jonathan Barnett, State Representative from District 87 (2013–2015) and District 97 (2009–2013)

===== California State Assembly =====
- Young Kim, State Assemblywoman from District 65 (2014–2016) and U.S. Representative for CA-39 (2021–present)

===== Colorado House of Representatives =====
- J. Paul Brown, State Representative from District 59 (2015–2017, 2010–2012)
- Justin Everett, State Representative from District 22 (2013–2019)
- Gordon Klingenschmitt, State Representative from District 15 (2015–2017)

===== Florida House of Representatives =====
- Matt Caldwell, State Representative from District 79 (2012–2018) and District 73 (2010–2012)

===== Georgia House of Representatives =====
- Melvin Everson, State Representative from District 106 (2005–2011)
- Bill Hembree, State Representative from District 67 (1999–2003)
- Alveda King, State Representative from District 28 (1979–1983), activist, author, niece of Martin Luther King Jr.
- Betty Price, State Representative from District 48 (2015–2019)

===== Idaho House of Representatives =====
- Cindy Agidius, State Representative from District 5 Seat A (2012–2014)

===== Illinois House of Representatives =====
- Jeanne Ives, State Representative from District 42 (2013–2019) and 2020 Republican nominee for IL-06

===== Iowa House of Representatives =====
- Carmine Boal, State Representative from District 70 (2003–2009) and District 65 (1999–2003)
- Ralph Klemme, State Representative from District 3 (2003–2005) and District 4 (1993–2003)

===== Kansas House of Representatives =====
- Larry Hibbard, State Representative from District 13 (2013–2019)

===== Kentucky House of Representatives =====
- Allen Maricle, State Representative from District 49 (1994–1998)
- Jonathan Shell, Majority Leader of the House of Representatives (2017–2019) State Representative from District 71 (2013–2019)

===== Louisiana House of Representatives =====
- David Duke, State Representative from District 81 (1989–1992), former Grand Wizard of the Ku Klux Klan and white supremacist
- Tony Perkins, State Representative from District 64 (1996–2004) and President of the Family Research Council

===== Maine House of Representatives =====
- Dale Crafts, State Representative from District 56 (2014–2016) and District 104 (2008–2014) and 2020 Republican nominee for ME-02
- Heather Sirocki, State Representative from District 28 (2010–2018)

===== Massachusetts House of Representatives =====
- Althea Garrison, State Representative from Suffolk District 5 (1993–1995) and member of the Boston City Council from the at-large district (2019–2020) (Independent)

===== Michigan House of Representatives =====
- Jase Bolger, Speaker of the House of Representatives (2011–2013) and State Representative from District 63 (2013–2019)
- Gary Glenn, State Representative from District 98 (2015–2018)
- Tim Kelly, State Representative from District 94 (2012–2019)
- Tom Leonard, Speaker of the House of Representatives (2017–2019) and State Representative from District 93 (2013–2019)
- Rocky Raczkowski, State Representative from District 9 (1997–2002)

===== Minnesota House of Representatives =====
- Matt Bliss, State Representative from District 5A (2017–2019)
- Gary Doty, State Representative from District 8A (1975–1976) and Mayor of Duluth, Minnesota (1992–2004) (Democratic-Farmer-Labor Party)
- Dan Severson, State Representative from District 14A (2003–2011)
- Steve Wenzel, State Representative from District 12B (1973–1982, 1997–2002) and District 13B (1983–1992) (Democratic–Farmer–Labor Party)

===== Missouri House of Representatives =====
- Paul Fitzwater, State Representative from District 144 (2011–2019)

===== Nevada Assembly =====
- Jill Dickman, State Assemblyman from District 31 (2015–2016)
- Jim Marchant, State Assemblyman from District 37 (2016–2018) and 2020 Republican nominee for NV-04

===== New Hampshire House of Representatives =====
- Lynne Blankenbeker, State Representative from the Merrimack's 11th District (2009–2012)
- Steve Negron, State Representative from Hillsborough District 32 (2016–2018)

===== New Jersey House of Representatives =====
- Jack Ciattarelli, State Assemblyman from District 16 (2011–2019)
- Sam Fiocchi, State Assemblyman from District 1 (2014–2016)
- Joe Howarth, State Assemblyman from District 8 (2016–2020)
- Vincent Polistina, State Assemblyman from District 2 (2008–2012)

===== New Mexico House of Representatives =====
- Sharon Clahchischilliage, State Representative from the District 4 (2013–2018)
- Yvette Herrell, State Representative from District 51 (2011–2019) and U.S. Representative for NM-02 (2021–present)
- Don Tripp, Speaker of the House of Representatives (2015–2017) and State Representative from District 49 (1999–2017)

===== New York State Assembly =====
- Dov Hikind, State Assemblyman from District 48 (1983–2018) (Democrat)
- Steve Levy, State Assemblyman from District 5 (2001–2003) and County Executive of Suffolk County (2004–2011)

===== North Dakota House of Representatives =====
- Clare Carlson, State Representative from District 18 (1992–1994)

===== Ohio House of Representatives =====
- Christina Hagan, State Representative from District 50 (2011–2019)
- Steve Kraus, State Representative from District 89 (2015)
- Michelle Schneider, State Representative from District 35 (2001–2008)

===== Oklahoma House of Representatives =====
- Cleta Mitchell, State Representative from District 44 (1976–1984)
- T. W. Shannon, Speaker of the House of Representatives (2013–2014) and State Representative from District 62 (2007–2015)

===== Oregon House of Representatives =====
- Knute Buehler, State Representative from District 54 (2015–2019)
- Kevin Mannix, State Representative from District 32 (1989–1997, 1999–2001)
- Gene Whisnant, State Representative from District 53 (2003–2019)

===== Pennsylvania House of Representatives =====
- Rick Saccone, State Representative from District 39 (2011–2019)

===== Rhode Island House of Representatives =====
- Doreen Costa, State Representative from District 31 (2011–2017)
- Patricia Morgan, Minority Leader of the House of Representatives (2017–2018) and State Representative from District 26 (2011–2019)

===== South Carolina House of Representatives =====
- Alan Clemmons, State Representative from District 107 (2002–2020)

===== Tennessee House of Representatives =====
- Scotty Campbell, State Representative from District 3 (2011–2012)

===== Utah House of Representatives =====
- Adam Gardiner, State Representative from District 43 (2017)
- Chris Herrod, State Representative from District 62 (2007–2013)
- Greg Hughes, Speaker of the House of Representatives (2015–2018) and State Representative from District 51 (2003–2018)

===== Vermont House of Representatives =====
- Janssen Willhoit, State Representative from Caledonia District 3 (2015–2019)

===== Virginia House of Delegates =====
- Winsome Earle Sears, State Delegate from District 90 (2002–2004) and Lieutenant Governor of Virginia (2022–present)

===== West Virginia House of Delegates =====
- John Overington, Speaker of the House of Delegates (2018), Speaker pro tempore of the House of Delegates (2017–2018) and State Delegate from District 62 (2013–2018), District 55 (2003–2013) and District 54 (1985–2003)
- Jill Upson, State Delegate from District 65 (2015–2019)

===== Wisconsin State Assembly =====
- Michelle Litjens, State Assemblywoman from District 56 (2011–2013)
