= Jeannette C. Hayner =

American politician (1919–2010)

Jeannette Hayner

Majority Leader of the Washington Senate
- In office January 11, 1988 – January 11, 1993
- Preceded by: Ted Bottiger
- Succeeded by: Marcus Gaspard
- In office January 12, 1981 – January 10, 1983
- Preceded by: Gordon Walgren
- Succeeded by: Ted Bottiger

Minority Leader of the Washington Senate
- In office January 10, 1983 – January 11, 1988
- Preceded by: Ted Bottiger
- Succeeded by: Larry Vognild

Member of the Washington Senate from the 16th district
- In office January 10, 1977 – January 11, 1993
- Preceded by: Dan Jolly
- Succeeded by: Valoria Loveland

Member of the Washington House of Representatives from the 16th district
- In office January 8, 1973 – January 10, 1977
- Preceded by: Doris Johnson
- Succeeded by: Gene Struthers

Personal details
- Born: Jeannette Hafner; January 22, 1919 Portland, Oregon
- Died: November 26, 2010 (aged 91) Eagle Springs, Washington
- Party: Republican
- Spouse: Herman H. "Dutch" Hayner
- Children: Stephen A. Hayner, James, Judy
- Education: University of Oregon
- Occupation: politician
- Profession: attorney

Jeannette C. Hayner (née Hafner; January 22, 1919 – November 26, 2010) was an American politician, the first woman to hold the position of Majority Leader in the Washington State Senate. She was Senate Republican Leader from 1979 until her retirement in 1992.

== Early life ==
Hayner was born Jeannette Hafner on January 22, 1919, in Portland, Oregon. She was the only child of a creamery owner. Jeannette attended Jefferson High School (Portland, Oregon). She earned a scholarship to the University of Oregon, where she studied business administration. A dean told her there was a bright future for women as lawyers, so she enrolled at the University of Oregon School of Law. Hayner was one of only two women to graduate from Oregon's law school in 1942.

Senator Hayner met her husband, Herman "Dutch" Hahner (the original spelling of the family name), at the law school and they were married in October 1942. In 1947 the couple moved to Walla Walla, Washington. The Hahners raised three children. Jeannette Hahner was active in a variety of civic and charitable organizations. She became the first woman elected to the Walla Walla School Board despite the fact that she ran as a write-in candidate. Hahner served on the school board for seven years until 1963, including two as board chair.

== Legislative career ==
In 1972, at age 53, Jeannette Hahner ran for the open Sixteenth District seat in the State House of Representatives. She prevailed over three men in the September primary and then defeated Democrat Sam Hunt in the general election. After the election the Hahners changed their last name to "Hayner". The family name originally had an umlaut over the "a," making Hahner sound like Hayner. Hayner was re-elected in 1974 and served as Minority Whip in the 1975-76 legislature.

In 1976 party leaders convinced Hayner to run for the state senate seat being vacated by Dan Jolly, a Democrat. Hayner defeated her Democratic opponent Gary Strohmaier by 541 votes out of more than 27,000 cast.

Near the end of the 1979 legislative session certain members of the Senate Republican Caucus moved to oust Republican Leader Jim Matson from his post. Matson had held the position since 1972. Hayner was reportedly a compromise candidate and narrowly edged Matson in a surprise vote about a week before the end of the session. Hayner thus became, at age 60, the first woman to hold a top leadership post in the Washington legislature. The Seattle Times reported that it was "a startling upset." Then-Senator Lois North later recalled, "There was a stunned silence on the floor of the Senate when it became apparent a woman was about to become the leader of her caucus.

In the elections of 1980 Senate Republicans gained five seats which put them at 24, one shy of a majority. On February 13, 1981, Democratic Senator Pete von Reichbauer changed his party affiliation to Republican, giving Republicans the majority in the State Senate for the first time in 26 years. It also made Jeannette Hayner the first woman Majority Leader in the history of the Washington Senate.

== Family life ==
Hayner and her husband had three children, James, Judy and the preacher and author Stephen A. Hayner.
