= Valoria Loveland =

American politician

Director of the Washington State Department of Agriculture
- In office April 22, 2002 – May 5, 2008
- Governor: Gary Locke; Christine Gregoire
- Preceded by: Bill Brookreson
- Succeeded by: Dan Newhouse

Member of the Washington Senate from the 16th district
- In office January 11, 1993 – January 8, 2001
- Preceded by: Jeannette C. Hayner
- Succeeded by: Mike Hewitt

Personal details
- Born: Alexandria, Louisiana, U.S.
- Party: Democratic

Valoria H. Loveland is an American farmer and politician who served as the director of the Washington State Department of Agriculture from 2002 to 2008. A member of the Democratic Party, she previously served as a member of the Washington State Senate, representing the 16th district from 1993 to 2001.
