= Mike Hewitt =

Mike Hewitt may refer to:

- Mike Hewitt (footballer) (born 1955), retired Scottish football goalkeeper
- Mike Hewitt (politician), American politician in the Washington State Senate
