= Senator Smallwood =

Senator Smallwood may refer to:

- Jim Smallwood (born c. 1971), Colorado State Senate
- William Smallwood (1732–1792), Maryland State Senate
