= Senator Jolly =

Senator Jolly may refer to:

- Dan Jolly (1907–1990), Washington State Senate
- Russell Jolly (born 1955), Mississippi State Senate

== See also ==
- Clark Jolley (bron 1970), Oklahoma State Senate
