= Charles Kilbury =

American politician

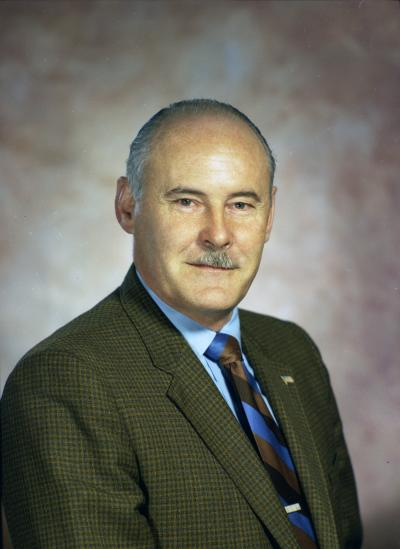
- Kilbury in 1971

Member of the Washington House of Representatives from the 16th district
- In office December 14, 1970 – January 8, 1979
- Preceded by: Daniel J. Jolly
- Succeeded by: Doc Hastings

Personal details
- Born: Charles Debriel Kilbury; February 2, 1919 Yakima, Washington, U.S.
- Died: January 17, 2005 (aged 85) Pasco, Washington, U.S.
- Party: Democratic

Charles Debriel Kilbury (February 2, 1919 – January 17, 2005) was an American politician in the state of Washington. He served in the Washington House of Representatives from 1970 to 1979.
