= Maureen Walsh =

American politician from Washington

Member of the Washington Senate from the 16th district
- In office January 9, 2017 – January 11, 2021
- Preceded by: Mike Hewitt
- Succeeded by: Perry Dozier

Member of the Washington House of Representatives from the 16th district
- In office January 10, 2005 – January 9, 2017
- Preceded by: Dave Mastin
- Succeeded by: Bill Jenkin

Personal details
- Born: November 18, 1960 (age 65) Cincinnati, Ohio, U.S.
- Party: Republican
- Spouse: Kelly Walsh (d. 2006)
- Children: 3
- Education: University of Cincinnati (AA)
- Website: Official

Maureen S. Walsh (born November 18, 1960) is an American politician who served as a member of the Washington State Senate, representing the 16th district from 2017 to 2021. A member of the Republican Party, she previously served as a member of the Washington House of Representatives from 2005 to 2017.

== Career ==
She serves on the Human Services, Mental Health and Housing; Health Care; and Transportation committees. On February 8, 2012, the Washington House of Representatives debated on the legalization of same-sex marriage, in which she made an emotional appeal to the legislators which subsequently was shared on social media. The House voted 55–43 in favor of legalizing same-sex marriage.

Walsh was criticized for her opposition to SHB 1155 in April 2019, a state bill that would guarantee nurses the right to uninterrupted meals and rest periods, Walsh argued that the bill should be amended to exclude critical access hospitals that serve less populated areas. This is because she believes that nurses just sit around and play cards.
