= Doc Hastings =

American politician (born 1941)

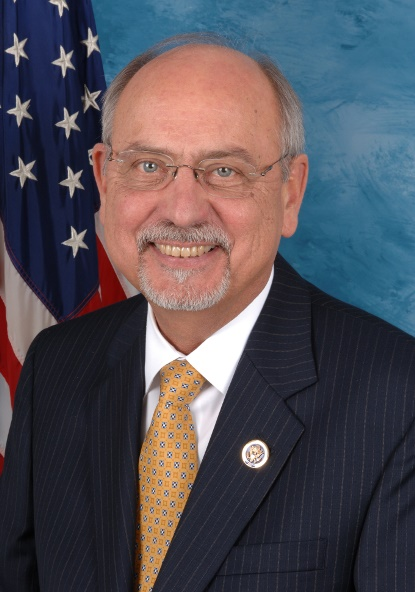
- Official portrait, 2009

Chair of the House Natural Resources Committee
- In office January 3, 2011 – January 3, 2015
- Preceded by: Nick Rahall
- Succeeded by: Rob Bishop

Chair of the House Ethics Committee
- In office January 3, 2005 – January 3, 2007
- Preceded by: Joel Hefley
- Succeeded by: Stephanie Tubbs Jones

Member of the U.S. House of Representatives from Washington's 4th district
- In office January 3, 1995 – January 3, 2015
- Preceded by: Jay Inslee
- Succeeded by: Dan Newhouse

Member of the Washington House of Representatives from the 16th district
- In office January 8, 1979 – January 3, 1987
- Preceded by: Charles Kilbury
- Succeeded by: Bill Grant

Personal details
- Born: Richard Norman Hastings; February 7, 1941 (age 85) Spokane, Washington, U.S.
- Party: Republican
- Spouse: Claire Hastings
- Children: 3
- Education: Columbia Basin College; Central Washington University

Military service
- Branch/service: United States Army Reserve
- Years of service: 1963–1969
- Rank: Specialist 4
- Hastings's voice Hastings opposing the Obama administration's offshore drilling plan. Recorded July 25, 2012

Richard Norman "Doc" Hastings (born February 7, 1941) is an American politician and member of the Republican Party who served as the U.S. representative for Washington's 4th congressional district from 1995 until his retirement in 2015. The district includes much of central Washington including the Tri-Cities, Yakima, and Moses Lake. The most conservative Republican in Washington's Congressional delegation, he chaired the House Committee on Ethics from 2005 to 2007 and chaired the House Committee on Natural Resources from 2011 to his leaving office.

Hastings retired in 2015 after declining to run for re-election in 2014.

== Early life, education, and business career ==
Richard Norman Hastings was born in Spokane, Washington to Ivan and Florene Hastings; he is of part Norwegian ancestry on the maternal side of his family. He served in the United States Army Reserve from 1964 to 1969.

He studied business administration at Columbia Basin College and Central Washington State College, but did not graduate from either. He was named Columbia Basin Alumni of the Year in 2001. He returned to Central Washington as commencement speaker in 2008.

Before being elected to Congress, Hastings ran his family-owned small business, Columbia Basin Paper and Supply. He was an active member of the Pasco Chamber of Commerce, the Pasco/Kennewick Rotary Club, the Pasco Downtown Development Association, and the Pasco Jaycees.

== Washington House of Representatives (1979-1987) ==
=== Elections ===
In 1978, Hastings ran for Washington's 16th House District (seat 2). He defeated incumbent Democratic State Representative Charles Kilbury 62%–38%. In 1980, he won re-election to a second term, defeating Democrat Dorothy Miller 70%–30%. In 1982, he was re-elected to a third term against Democrat Sandy Dodd by 55%–45%. In 1984, he won re-election to a fourth term, defeating Democrat Bill Grant 52%–48%.

=== Tenure ===
Hastings served in the Washington House of Representatives from 1979 to 1987, where he was selected by his colleagues to be Assistant Majority Leader and Republican Caucus Chairman. In 1983, he challenged the constitutionality of the state's 1.1% sales tax hike. He voluntarily left the Legislature, claiming family reasons.

=== Committee assignments ===
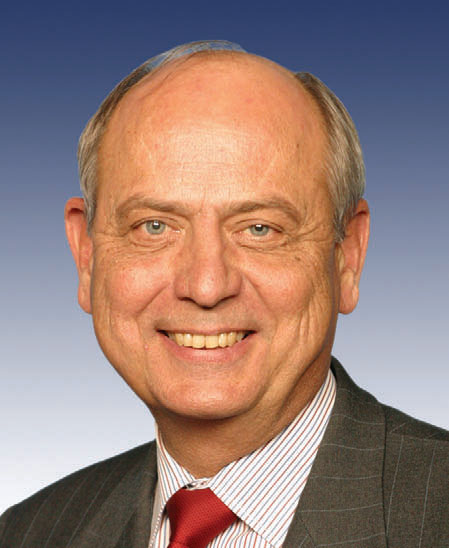
Official 109th Congressional photo

He served on the House Tax Advisory Committee.

== U.S. House of Representatives (1995-2015) ==
=== Elections ===
Incumbent Republican Sid Morrison, of Washington's 4th congressional district, decided to retire in 1992 in order to run for Governor of Washington. Hastings ran, but lost in the general election to Democratic State Representative Jay Inslee, 51%–49%. Although Hastings carried the Tri-Cities, he lost the rest of the district. He won three (Benton, Franklin, and Adams) of the district's ten counties.

Hastings sought a rematch against Inslee in 1994, and defeated him, 53%–47%, winning eight of the district's ten counties. In 1996, he was re-elected to a second term, defeating Democrat Rick Locke 53%–47%. He never faced another contest anywhere near that close, and was reelected eight more times with at least 60% of the vote.

=== Tenure ===
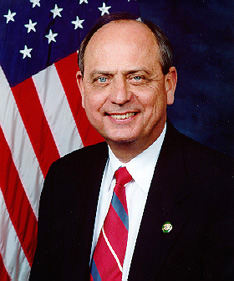
Earlier official photo of Hastings

Political positions

In response to Project Vote Smart, Hastings wrote, "Top priorities must be creating jobs, getting our economy back on track, and stopping reckless spending that has left our nation with the largest deficit in history". The Seattle Post-Intelligencer considers Hastings to be a "down-the-line supporter of the House Republican leadership".

Hastings has served as Chairman of the House Committee on Natural Resources since January 2011 and is a proponent of increasing domestic production of oil and gas, including drilling in the Arctic National Wildlife Refuge in Alaska. In November 2010 he said that "Promoting new domestic energy production, including in the Arctic, will be a priority" for the committee.

Interest group ratings

Hastings has a lifetime score of 3% from the League of Conservation Voters.

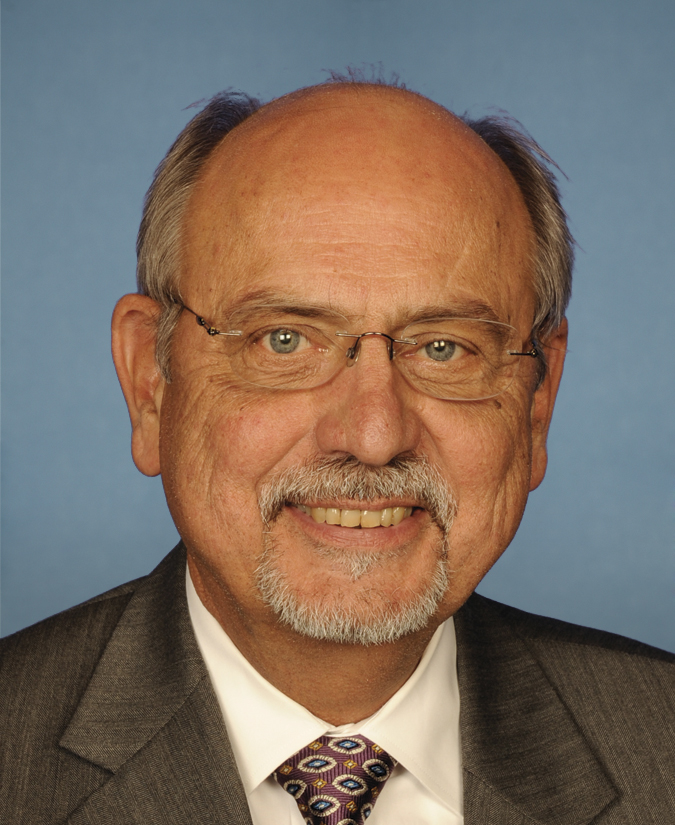
Hastings during the 112th United States Congress

Hastings is rated as one of the most pro-business representatives in Congress, according to the United States Chamber of Commerce which gives Hastings a score of 94 out of 100 based on his 16-year voting record. The 501(c)4 organization Club for Growth gave Hastings a grade of 94 out of 100.

The National Taxpayers Union gives Hastings a grade of A. Hastings has been given an 'A' grade by Liz Cheney's Keep America Safe PAC He earned a 95.15% lifetime rating, as of 2010, from the American Conservative Union.

Hastings is pro-life, demonstrated by consistent ratings of 100% from the National Right to Life Committee. He has received mixed ratings from some national agricultural groups. For 2009–2010 the American Farm Bureau Federation gave Representative Hastings a 66% rating. His rating from the National Association of Wheat Growers was 25 percent in 2008.

In 2009 and 2010, he received grades of "D" and "F" from the teachers union-affiliated National Education Association, and 0% from the American Association of University Women. In 2009–10, Iraq and Afghanistan Veterans of America gave Hastings a grade of "D".

Controversies

Hastings was instrumental in 2002 in building the case that led to the expulsion of Congressman James Traficant (I-OH) from the United States Congress. As Chairman of the Investigative Subcommittee of the United States House Committee on Ethics, Hastings was tasked with reviewing the file from Traficant's trial and other material to determine if there had been a violation of House rules. Hastings said on the floor of the House, "After considering all of the evidence, I concluded that Mr. Traficant's offenses were so serious and so purposeful that expulsion from the House is the only appropriate sanction". The measure to remove Traficant from the House passed 420–1.

In 1996, lobbyist Jack Abramoff and his firm had as many as 36 contacts with Hastings' office, resulting in as many as 85.57 billed hours regarding the Commonwealth of the Northern Mariana Islands. Abramoff bragged to the CNMI of having "excellent" ties to Hastings. Hastings' 2004 campaign had received $1,000 from Abramoff personally and an additional $5,647 from Abramoff's lobbying firm, which was also one of the largest law firms in the State of Washington, Preston Gates. Preston Gates, Microsoft's law and lobbying firm, also contributed to Washington Democrats during that cycle, including to Seattle's Jim McDermott.

Following Hastings' work that led to Traficant's removal from the House, he was named to the Chairmanship of the United States House Committee on Ethics. Soon after being named chairman, two senior staff members for the committee were fired, and Hastings attempted to place his office Chief of Staff, Ed Cassidy, onto the Ethics Committee staff. Democrats cast this a partisan move, while Republicans pointed out that such a change in staff is the norm with the naming of a new committee chairman. Hastings came under fire during his chairmanship of the Ethics Committee, due to claims by Democrats of inaction regarding then-House Majority Leader Tom DeLay. By rule, the House Ethics Committee's work, votes, and investigative findings are kept strictly confidential.

In 2008, Hastings, by now the ranking member of the Ethics Committee, pushed the investigation of Charlie Rangel. A four-person investigative subcommittee was formed with Hastings as co-chair. The subcommittee's subsequent report led to Rangel's loss of the chairmanship of the powerful Ways and Means Committee and censure by the House in 2010.

=== Committee assignments ===
- Committee on Natural Resources (Chair)
  - As chairman of the full committee, Rep. Hastings was entitled to sit as an ex officio member of all subcommittees.

Hastings chaired the Committee on Standards of Official Conduct, also known as the House Ethics Committee from 2005 to 2007,(109th United States Congress) replacing outgoing chairman Joel Hefley.

=== Caucus memberships ===
- House Nuclear Clean-Up Caucus (chairman and founder)
- Northwest Energy Caucus (Co-chair)
- Rural Health Care Coalition
- Specialty Crop Caucus
- Hastings is the senior Republican in Congress from the Pacific Northwest.

=== Legislation sponsored ===
- On April 12, 2013, Hastings introduced the Restoring Healthy Forests for Healthy Communities Act (H.R. 1526; 113th Congress). The bill would direct the United States Department of Agriculture to establish at least one Forest Reserve Revenue Area within each unit of the National Forest System designated for sustainable forest management for the production of national forest materials (the sale of trees, portions of trees, or forest products from System lands) and forest reserve revenues (to be derived from the sale of such materials in such an Area). The bill states that the purpose of an Area is to provide a dependable source of 25% payments and economic activity for each beneficiary county containing System land that was eligible to receive payments through its state under the Secure Rural Schools and Community Self-Determination Act of 2000.
- On June 19, 2014, Hastings introduced the Lowering Gasoline Prices to Fuel an America That Works Act of 2014 (H.R. 4899; 113th Congress). The bill would revise existing laws and policies regarding the development of oil and gas resources on the Outer Continental Shelf. The bill is intended to increase domestic energy production and lower gas prices. Hastings argued that "the current turmoil in Iraq has already caused the price of gasoline to increase, and it serves as an important reminder of why we need to increase production here at home" because it is the "best way to protect ourselves from price spikes caused by international conflicts."

== Personal life ==
In 1967, Hastings married his wife, Claire, in Sacramento, California; the couple has three children: Kirsten, Petrina, and Colin, and has 8 grandchildren.

== Electoral history ==
Washington's 4th congressional district: Results 1992–2010
Year	Democrat	Votes	Pct	Republican	Votes	Pct	3rd party	Party	Votes	Pct
1992	Jay Inslee	106,556	51%	Richard Hastings	103,028	49%				
1994	Jay Inslee	81,198	47%	Richard Hastings	92,828	53%				
1996	Rick Locke	96,502	47%	Richard Hastings	108,647	53%				
1998	Gordon Allen Pross	43,043	24%	Richard Hastings	121,684	69%	Peggy S. McKerlie	Reform	11,363	6%
2000	Jim Davis	87,585	37%	Richard Hastings	143,259	61%	Fred D. Krauss	Libertarian	4,260	2%
2002	Craig Mason	53,572	33%	Richard Hastings	108,257	67%				
2004	Sandy Matheson	92,486	37%	Richard Hastings	154,627	63%				
2006	Richard Wright	77,054	40%	Richard Hastings	115,246	60%				
2008	George Fearing	99,430	37%	Richard Hastings	169,940	63%				
2010	Jay Clough	69,512	32%	Richard Hastings	145,317	68%				

== See also ==
- Central Washington
- Eastern Washington

U.S. House of Representatives
Preceded by Jay Inslee	Member of the U.S. House of Representatives from Washington's 4th congressional district 1995–2015	Succeeded by Dan Newhouse
Preceded by Joel Hefley	Chair of the House Ethics Committee; 2005–2007	Succeeded by Stephanie Tubbs Jones
Preceded by Stephanie Tubbs Jones	Ranking Member of the House Ethics Committee; 2007–2009	Succeeded by Jo Bonner
Preceded by Don Young	Ranking Member of the House Natural Resources Committee; 2009–2011	Succeeded by Ed Markey
Preceded by Nick Rahall	Chair of the House Natural Resources Committee; 2011–2015	Succeeded by Rob Bishop
U.S. order of precedence (ceremonial)
Preceded by Joel Hefley as Former U.S. Representative	Order of precedence of the United States as Former U.S. Representative	Succeeded by Cathy McMorris Rodgers as Former U.S. Representative
