= Stephen A. Hayner =

- Born: June 23, 1948
- Died: January 31, 2015 (aged 66)
- Education: B.A. Whitman College; M.T.S. Harvard Divinity School; Th.M. Gordon-Conwell Theological Seminary; Ph.D. University of St. Andrews
- Occupations: Presbyterian minister, theological educator, administrator at Seattle Pacific University, president of para-church campus ministry, and president of Columbia Theological Seminary
- Spouse: Sharol Rhodes (m. 1973)

Stephen A. Hayner (June 23, 1948 – January 31, 2015) was an American Presbyterian minister who was the president of Columbia Theological Seminary, a professor, an author, and the president of InterVarsity Christian Fellowship from 1988 to 2001.

== Personal life ==
His parents were Herman H. "Dutch" and Jeannette C. Hayner.

While studying in the Boston area, he served at the Park Street Church where he met Sharol Rhodes, and they later married in June 1973. He and Sharol had three children, Emilie, Chip and Drew.

He was diagnosed with pancreatic cancer in 2014 and died in 2015.

== Education ==
Hayner graduated from Walla Walla High School in Walla Walla, WA. He began his education at Whitman College where he earned his B.A. in English Literature in 1970. In 1972, he continued his education at Harvard Divinity School where he received his M.T.S. in Semitic Studies and one year later earned a Th.M. from Gordon-Conwell Theological Seminary. Following this he traveled to St. Andrews, Fife, Scotland and studied at the University of St. Andrews where in 1984 he earned his Ph.D. in Hebrew and Semitic Languages. Back in the United States, he was awarded an honorary D.D. degree in 2011 by Presbyterian College.

== Career ==
While at Harvard Divinity School, Hayner experienced God's call to full-time ministry in the church. After receiving his degree from Gordon-Conwell Theological Seminary in 1973, he was ordained and installed as “university pastor” at University Presbyterian Church in Seattle to minister with students and faculty. While he was there, he utilized two sabbaticals to complete his Ph.D. in Hebrew and Semitic Studies at the University of St. Andrews in Scotland. After eleven years he then took the position of Vice President of Student Affairs at Seattle Pacific University. Throughout his time in Seattle he was also very involved with Fuller Theological Seminary extension sites and served as an adjunct professor of Old Testament.

In 1983, he co-founded (with Mark Labberton) the Christian International Scholarship Foundation, now called Scholar Leaders.

In 1988, he was called as President of InterVarsity Christian Fellowship, a non-denominational discipleship ministry to students on campuses across the country. He still found education to be extremely valuable and continued to serve as an adjunct of professor of Old Testament at a number of schools including: Gordon-Conwell Theological Seminary, Regent College, and Trinity Evangelical Divinity School. In 2001, he became the Senior Associate Pastor at High Point Church and the Associate Pastor at Fountain of Life Family Worship Center (now Fountain of Life Covenant Church).

In 2003, he was called as the Peachtree Professor of Evangelism and Church Growth at Columbia Theological Seminary in Decatur, Georgia, while also serving as Scholar in Residence at Peachtree Presbyterian Church. In 2009, he was called as the Seminary's ninth President.

In addition to his professional career, he has also been deeply involved with various organizations that serve surrounding communities. He has been on several national and international boards including World Vision United States, World Vision International and International Justice Mission. He also served on the board of directors for other organizations such as the Evangelical Environmental Network, the Presbyterian Global Fellowship, The Navigators, Fuller Theological Seminary, and The Stony Brook School.

He valued education, both in the academic setting and in the church. His passion was to prepare women and men to lead congregations toward the fulfillment of God's call to be churches who are biblically faithful and growing steadily in their love for God, their love for each other, and their love for Christ's work in the world.

After being diagnosed with pancreatic cancer in the Spring of 2014, Hayner died on January 31, 2015. Columbia Theological Seminary made a statement about that:

The Rev. Dr. Stephen (Steve) A. Hayner, president emeritus of Columbia Theological Seminary, passed away today at the age of 66 surrounded by family and friends in the Columbia community. Known by many throughout the world with love, affection, and gratitude, Steve was a person of many honors and degrees who refused to categorize others or himself by achievements. His goal was to always live to and for an audience of One, and his hope was to live life with wide open arms and relational integrity. His life was imbued with joy and freedom, which touched and changed many people along the way.

Hayner and his wife Sharol kept an active online journal at CaringBridge.org from the time of his diagnosis until after his death. The entries include health updates and personal reflections on faith, hope, mortality, suffering and joy from Steve, Sharol and their grown son and daughter. These reflections have been published as a book called Joy in the Journey by InterVarsity Press, also including comments and prayers from friends and other family members.

== Writings ==
- A Passover Haggadah for Christians, Pilgrim Associates, 1979.
- Pilgrimage of Faith, Pilgrim Associates, 1985, 1991, 1995.
- Criticism: Giving It and Taking It with John W. Alexander, IVP, 2000.
- “The Story of the Missional Church,” Outlook, 2007 and Cross Culture, 2006.
- “Protagonist Corner,” Journal for Preachers, 2008.
- “Nurturing Your Organization’s Culture,” Non-Profit Leadership in a For Profit World, Standard Publishing, 2011.
- “Why Study the Bible,” Student Leadership Journal, 1992.
- Editor, Global Issues Bible Studies (12 vols.), InterVarsity Press, 1990.
- “What Dr. Ruth Couldn’t Tell You,” Life Issues, Nav Press, 1991.
- “Going After Lost Sheep,” Student Leadership, 1991.
- “Leaders of Renewal,” with Max De Pree, ReNews, 1992.
- “Risking Rejection,” Decision, 1998.
- “Leadership as a Work of Heart,” ACSI Int’l Leadership Academy, 2003.
- “Handy Tips for Dating Relationships,” Student Leadership Journal, 2004.
- “The Shape of Things to Come,” @ ThisPoint online journal, 2007.
- “Forward,” When God Lets You Down, by Alex Gee, IVP, 2006.
- Joy in the Journey, with Sharol Hayner, InterVarsity Press, 2015
