= Lisa Frizell =

American politician

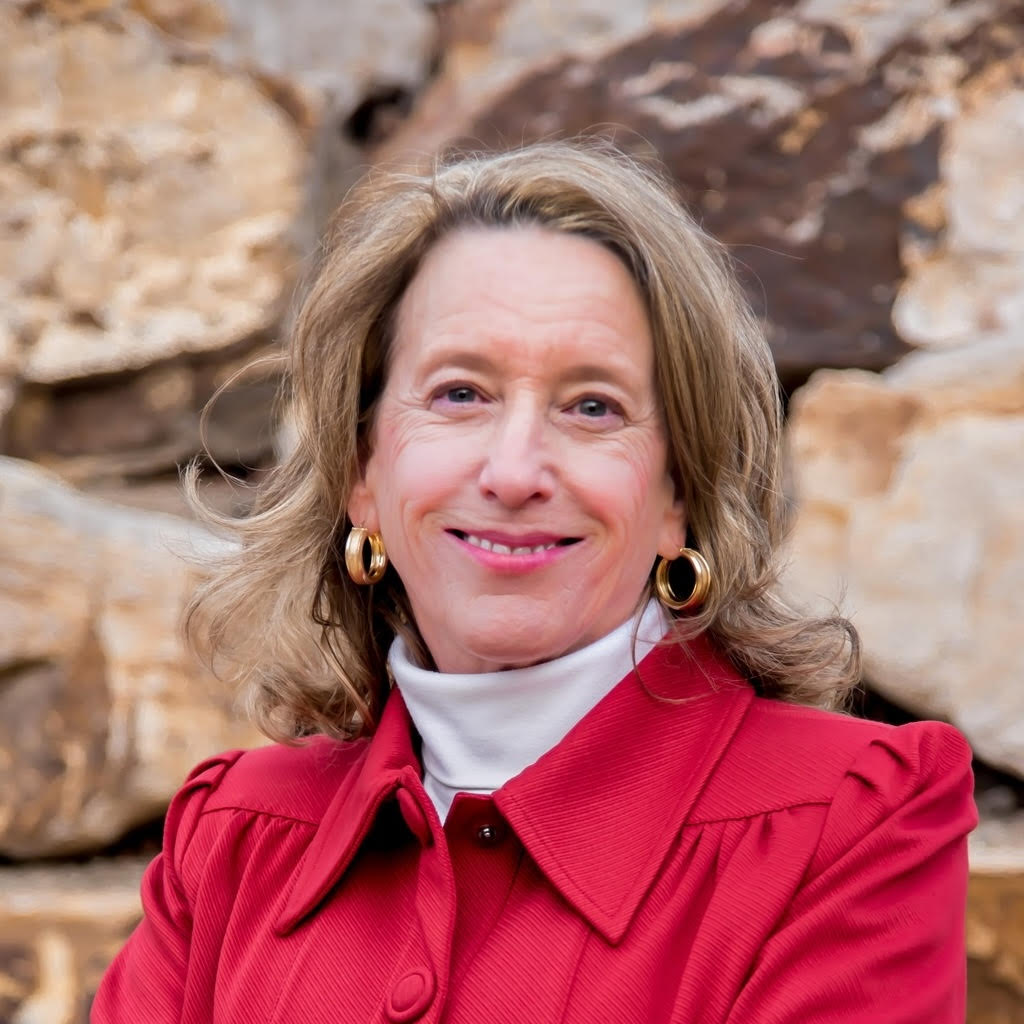

Member of the Colorado Senate from the 2nd district
- Incumbent
- Assumed office January 8, 2025
- Leader: Minority Leader
- Preceded by: Jim Smallwood

Member of the Colorado House of Representatives from the 45th district
- In office January 9, 2023 – January 8, 2025
- Preceded by: Patrick Neville
- Succeeded by: Max Brooks

Personal details
- Party: Republican
- Spouse: David
- Children: 2
- Education: University of Colorado Boulder
- Profession: Politician
- Website: www.lisaforco.com

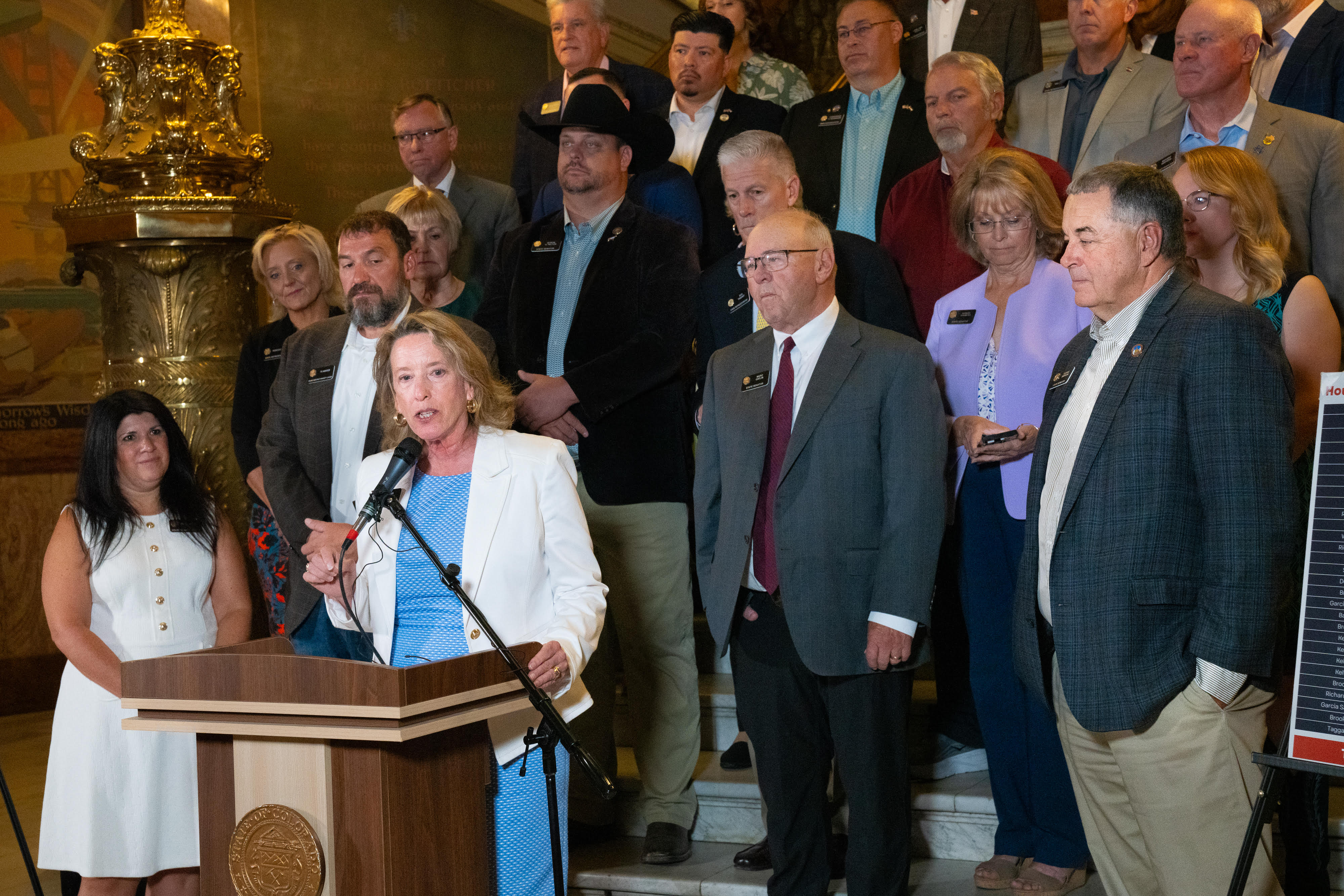
Senator Lisa Frizell at the Colorado State Capital

Elizabeth Norris "Lisa" Frizell is a Republican member of the Colorado Senate from Castle Rock, Colorado. She represents Colorado's 2nd Senate district which includes part of Douglas County, Colorado. During the 76th General Assembly, Lisa will serve as the Senate Minority Leader. Previously, she represented Colorado House of Representatives District 45, which included the Douglas County communities of Castle Rock, The Pinery, and Castle Pines Village.

== Background ==
Frizell was elected to two four-year terms as Douglas County Assessor in 2014 and 2018. Prior to her election as assessor, she had worked in the assessor's office since 1998. She served a term as president of the Colorado Assessor's Association and served as chair and treasurer of the Castle Rock Chamber of Commerce. She grew up in Douglas County and graduated from Douglas County High School in Castle Rock. She also earned a bachelor's degree in engineering from the University of Colorado Boulder.

== Legislative career ==
Frizell was first elected to the Colorado General Assembly in the 2022 Colorado House of Representatives election where she represented the 42nd Colorado House District. In 2024, she was elected to represent Colorado's 2nd Senate district.

=== 74th General Assembly ===
At the start of the 2023 legislative session, Frizell served on the House Appropriations Committee, the House Business Affairs and Labor Committee, and the House Finance Committee. Additionally, Frizell served on the Legislative Audit Committee during the 2024 session.

During the 2024 session, Frizell prime sponsored a bill that expanded protections for victims of sexual assault. The bill barred courts from admitting what sexual assault victims were wearing, or their past sexual history, as evidence to prove consent.

=== 75th General Assembly ===
In the 2025 legislative session, Frizell serves on the Legislative Audit Committee, the Committee on Legal Services, the Senate Health & Human Services, the Senate Finance committee, and the Senate Judiciary committee. In June 2025, Frizell was elected to serve as the Assistant Senate Minority Leader.

== Elections ==
=== 2022 ===
In the 2022 Colorado House of Representatives election, Frizell defeated her Democratic Party opponent, winning 61.88% of the total votes cast.

=== 2024 ===
In January 2024, Frizell announced her candidacy for the Republican nomination to represent Colorado's 2nd Senate district in the 2024 Colorado Senate election. In the Republican primary election held June 25, 2024, she defeated opponent Timothy Wesley Arvidson, winning 66.22% of the votes. In the general election held November 5, 2024, Frizell defeated Democratic candidate Jennifer Brady and Libertarian candidate Caryn Ann Harlos, winning 60.68% of the total votes cast.

== Elections Results ==
2024 Republican State Senate District 2 Primary Election
Party	Candidate	Votes	%
Republican	Lisa Frizell	15,925	66.2%
Republican	Tim Arvidson	8,124	33.8%

2024 General State Senate District 2 Election
Party	Candidate	Votes	%
Republican	Lisa Frizell	63,181	60.7%
Democratic	Jennifer Brady	38,261	36.7%
Libertarian	Caryn Ann Harlos	2,672	2.6%

2022 Republican State House District 45 Primary Election
Party	Candidate	Votes	%
Republican	Lisa Frizell	8,498	56.1%
Republican	Bill Jack	6,658	43.9%

2022 General State House District 45 Election
Party	Candidate	Votes	%
Republican	Lisa Frizell	27,884	61.9%
Democratic	Ruby Martinez	17,180	38.1%
