= Dan Jolly =

American politician (1907–1990)

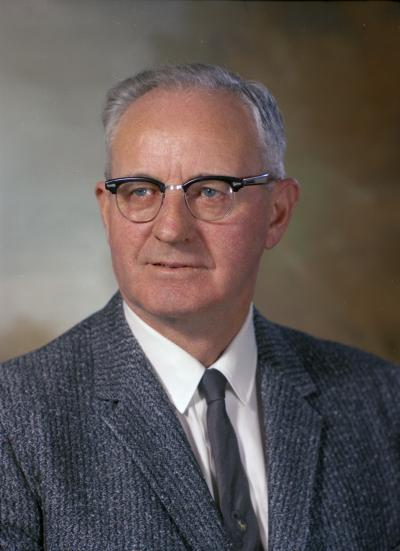
- Jolly in 1967

Member of the Washington Senate from the 16th district
- In office December 14, 1970 – January 10, 1977
- Preceded by: Mike McCormack
- Succeeded by: Jeannette C. Hayner

Member of the Washington House of Representatives from the 16th district
- In office January 14, 1963 – December 14, 1970
- Preceded by: Richard C. Cecil
- Succeeded by: Charles D. Kilbury

Personal details
- Born: Daniel John Jolly; April 3, 1907 Leahy, Washington, U.S.
- Died: September 11, 1990 (aged 83) Connell, Washington, U.S.
- Party: Democratic
- Occupation: Farmer

Daniel John Jolly (April 3, 1907 – September 11, 1990) was an American farmer and politician from the state of Washington. He served in the Washington House of Representatives from 1963 to 1970, and in the Washington Senate from 1970 to 1977.
