= Kenneth Kester =

American politician

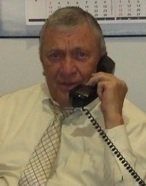
- Kester in 2007

Member of the Colorado Senate from the 2nd district
- In office January 8, 2003 – January 12, 2011
- Succeeded by: Kevin Grantham

Member of the Colorado House of Representatives from the 47th district
- In office January 6, 1999 – January 8, 2003

Personal details
- Born: March 16, 1936 Lamar, Colorado
- Died: February 17, 2018 (aged 81) Green Valley, Arizona
- Party: Republican
- Spouse: widowed

Kenneth Kester (March 16, 1936 – February 17, 2018) was a Republican member of the Colorado Senate, representing the 2nd district from 2003 to 2011. Previously he was a member of the Colorado House of Representatives from 1998 to 2002.

He was a General Motors auto dealer for 30 years. He was the father of three sons, Dan, Mike and Ed and a grandfather of two grandchildren.

== Legislative career ==
Kester had the largest district, geographically. Senator Kester previously served as a Bent County Commissioner. He served in the Colorado State House from 1999 to 2003, serving the counties of Baca, Bent, Crowley, Las Animas, Otero, and Huerfano. In 2002 he was elected to represent the people of Senate District 2.

He served on the Agriculture, Natural Resources committee and for a time was the ranking Republican member of the Local Government & Energy committee.

Kester's main focus was on lowering the state income tax, strengthening education and agricultural products and promoting small business.
