= Mark Klicker =

American businessman and politician from Washington

Member of the Washington House of Representatives from the 16th district
- Incumbent
- Assumed office January 11, 2021 Serving with Skyler Rude
- Preceded by: Bill Jenkin

Personal details
- Born: Mark Robert Klicker; March 26, 1963 (age 63) Walla Walla, Washington, U.S.
- Party: Republican
- Spouse: Lisa Klicker
- Children: 3
- Education: Walla Walla Community College (AA)
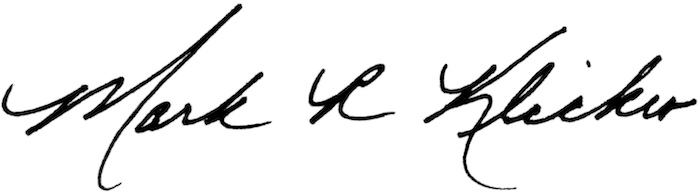
- Signature

Mark Robert Klicker (born March 26, 1963) is an American businessman and politician who is a member of the Washington House of Representatives for the 16th district. Elected in 2020, he assumed office on January 11, 2021.

== Early life and education ==
Klicker was born and raised in Walla Walla, Washington. As a child, he worked on his family's ranch in the Walla Walla Valley agricultural region. Klicker earned an Associate degree from Walla Walla Community College.

== Career ==
Klicker has worked as a licensed realtor and founded the Urban, Farm and Forest Group, a real estate investment and development company that specializes in rural projects. Klicker also served as the president of the Washington Farm Bureau. Klicker previously owned Klicker Enterprises Asphalt Seal Coat Company and Alpha Omega Klicker Cherries.

After incumbent representative Bill Jenkin announced that he would not seek re-election to the Washington House of Representatives, Klicker announced his candidacy to succeed him. Klicker defeated Democrat Frances Chvatal in the nonpartisan blanket primary and November general election.

In 2024, Klicker sponsored legislation that would have lifted local regulations that currently prohibit commercial activities (such as cafes) in residential zones. The bill passed the Washington House on a unanimous vote, but was held up in the Washington Senate amid lobbying pressure from NIMBYs.

== Personal life ==
Klicker's wife is Lisa Klicker. They have three children. Klicker and his family live in Walla Walla, Washington.
