= Bill Jenkin =

American businessman and politician from Washington

Member of the Washington House of Representatives from the 16th district
- In office January 9, 2017 – January 11, 2021
- Preceded by: Maureen Walsh
- Succeeded by: Mark Klicker

Personal details
- Born: William Richard Jenkin; 1956 San Diego, California, U.S.
- Party: Republican
- Education: University of Redlands (BBA)
- Occupation: Businessman, politician

William Richard Jenkin (born 1956) is an American politician and businessman from Washington. Jenkin is a former Republican member of Washington House of Representatives for District 16, Position 1, which includes portions of Benton, Columbia, Franklin, and Walla Walla counties from 2017 to 2021.

== Early life ==
Jenkin was born and raised in San Diego, California.

== Education ==
Jenkin earned a bachelor's degree in business management from the University of Redlands.

== Career ==
Jenkin is the owner of Prosser Vineyards and Winery, a winery in Washington.

On November 8, 2016, Jenkin won the election and became a Republican member of Washington House of Representatives for District 16, Position 1. Jenkin defeated Rebecca Francik with 62.03% of the votes. Jenkin assumed office on January 9, 2017. Jenkin succeeded Maureen Walsh, who was elected to the Washington State Senate.

On November 6, 2018, as an incumbent, Jenkin won the election and continued serving Washington House of Representatives for District 16, Position 1. Jenkin defeated Everett Maroon with 62.66% of the votes.

In November 2019, Jenkin announced that he would not seek re-election in 2020 and would instead run for the Washington State Senate.

== Personal life ==
Jenkin lives in Prosser, Washington.
