= Doris Johnson =

American politician in Washington (1923–2021)

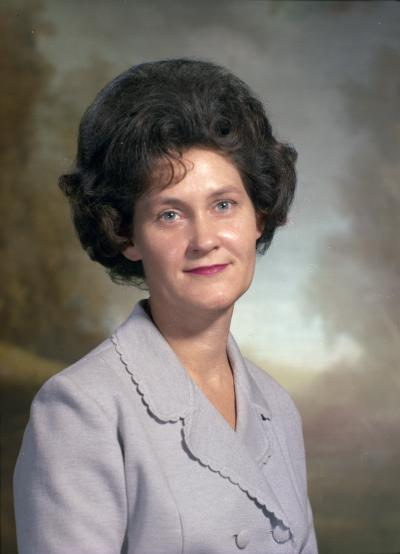
- Doris Johnson in 1967

Member of the Washington House of Representatives from the 16th district
- In office January 11, 1965 – January 13, 1969
- Preceded by: Walt Reese
- Succeeded by: C. E. Evans

Member of the Washington House of Representatives from the 16th district
- In office January 11, 1971 – January 8, 1973
- Preceded by: C. E. Evans
- Succeeded by: Jeannette C. Hayner

Member of the Washington House of Representatives from the 8th district
- In office January 8, 1973 – January 13, 1975
- Preceded by: Irving Newhouse
- Succeeded by: James M. Boldt

Personal details
- Born: Doris June Bishop; June 23, 1923 Ferndale, Washington, U.S.
- Died: June 27, 2021 (aged 98) Kennewick, Washington, U.S.
- Party: Democratic
- Occupation: school counselor, politician

Doris June Johnson (née Bishop, June 23, 1923 – June 27, 2021) was an American politician in the state of Washington. Johnson served in the Washington House of Representatives as a Democrat from the 16th District, as well as the 8th District. A school counselor, Johnson attended Western Washington State College and earned a master's degree in education. She was raised in Bellingham, Washington. She married Harold Johnson and had a daughter, Adra Ann. Doris Johnson lived in Kennewick, Washington, where she died on June 27, 2021, at the age of 98.
