= Mike Hewitt (politician) =

American politician (born 1946)

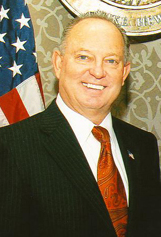

Minority Leader of the Washington Senate
- In office November 29, 2005 – December 10, 2012
- Preceded by: Bill Finkbeiner
- Succeeded by: Ed Murray

Member of the Washington Senate from the 16th district
- In office January 8, 2001 – January 9, 2017
- Preceded by: Valoria Loveland
- Succeeded by: Maureen Walsh

Personal details
- Born: Michael Dean Hewitt; January 23, 1946 (age 80) Walla Walla, Washington
- Party: Republican
- Spouse: Cora
- Website: Official

Michael Dean Hewitt (born January 23, 1946) is an American politician of the Republican Party. He was a member of the Washington State Senate. He represented District 16 from 2001 to 2017.

== Awards ==
- 2014 Guardians of Small Business award. Presented by NFIB.
