= Kevin Grantham =

American politician (born 1970)

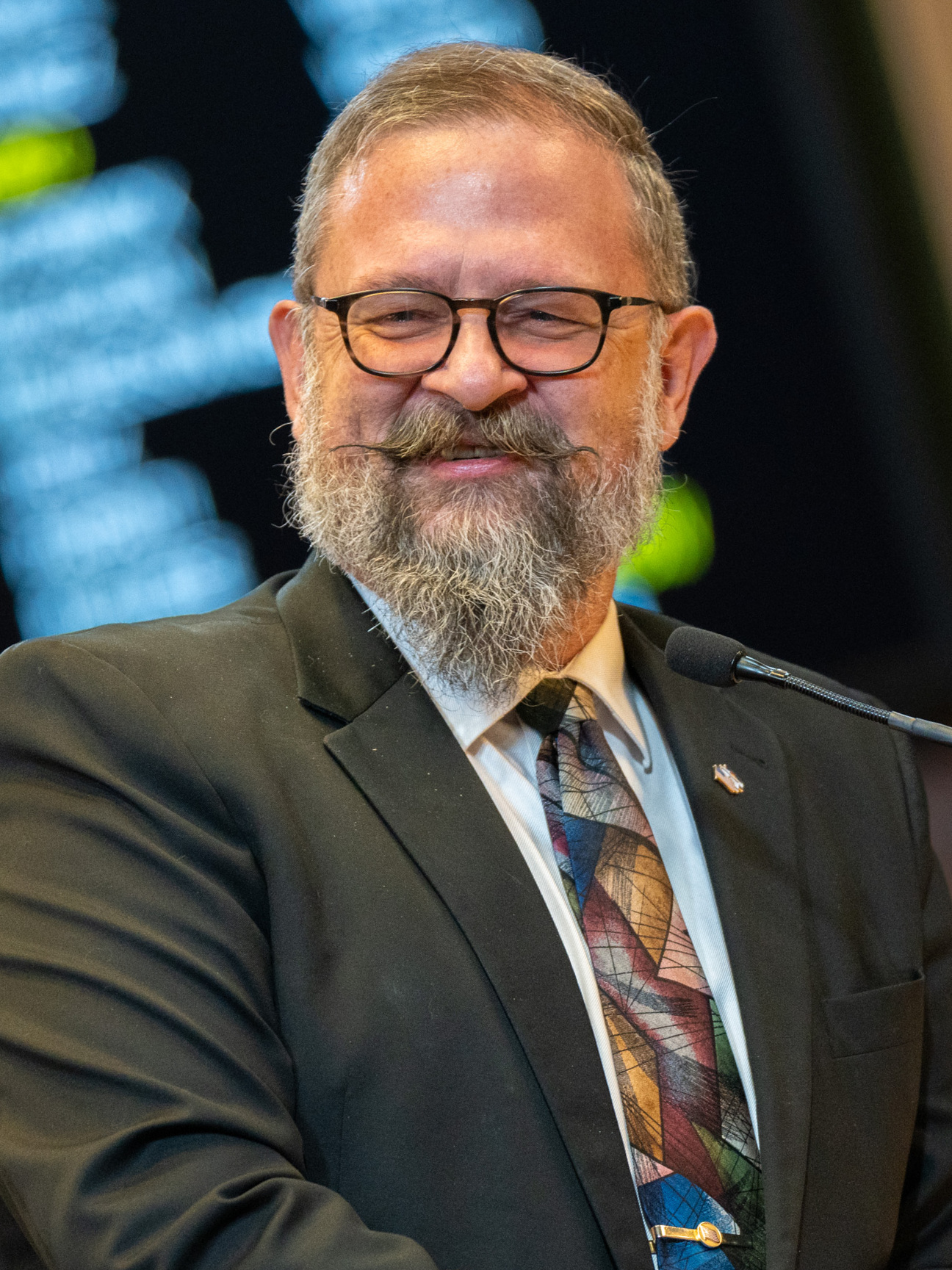
- Grantham in 2023

President of the Colorado Senate
- In office January 11, 2017 – January 4, 2019
- Preceded by: Bill Cadman
- Succeeded by: Leroy Garcia

Member of the Colorado Senate from the 2nd district
- In office January 12, 2011 – January 4, 2019
- Preceded by: Ken Kester
- Succeeded by: Dennis Hisey

Personal details
- Born: June 29, 1970 (age 56) Ordway, Colorado, U.S.
- Party: Republican
- Spouse: Caroline
- Children: 2
- Education: Liberty University (BA)

Kevin J. Grantham (born June 29, 1970) is an American politician who serves on the county commission of Fremont County, Colorado. He served in the Colorado Senate from the 2nd district as a member of the Republican Party from 2011 to 2019. He served as president of the state senate during his tenure.

Grantham was born in Ordway, Colorado, and educated at Liberty University. His father had been the chair of the Crowley County Republican Party and his son later served as a county clerk and recorder. He served on the board of adjustments and city council in Cañon City before he was elected to the state senate.

He served as the chair of the Appropriations committee in the state senate. He served as the Republican caucus whip and later as president of the state senate. Grantham was criticized for his handling of sexual harassment allegations during his tenure as president. He has served on the Fremont County Commission from the 1st district since January 12, 2021.

== Early life and education ==
Kevin Grantham was born in Ordway, Colorado. His father served as the chair of the Republican Party in Crowley County, Colorado. He graduated from Liberty University with a Bachelor of Arts degree in religion. He married Caroline, with whom he had two children. His son, Justin, serves as the county clerk and recorder in Fremont County.

== Career ==
=== Colorado Senate ===
==== Elections ====
Grantham defeated Matt Heimerich in the 2010 Republican primary for a seat in the Colorado Senate from the 2nd district, and won against Democratic nominee Gloria Stultz in the general election. He defeated Green Party nominee Martin T. Wirth in the 2014 election.

==== Tenure ====
During Grantham's tenure in the state senate he served on the Agriculture and Natural Resources, State Veterans and Military Affairs, Finance, and Joint Budget committee. He served as the chair of the Appropriations committee. He replaced Senator Steve King on the Legislative Audit committee while King faced felony charges.

He supported Mitt Romney during the 2012 Republican presidential primary and served as an unpledged delegate to the Republican National Convention. He served as the whip for the Republican caucus from 2012 to 2014. On November 10, 2016, he was selected to serve as the president of the state senate.

Grantham was criticized for his handling of sexual assault and harassment claims against member of the state senate due to partisanship. He stated that Senator Daniel Kagan had acted improperly before an investigation was started while he stated that investigations into Republican senators Randy Baumgardner, Larry Crowder, and Jack Tate were flawed. He requested for Beth McCann, the Denver District Attorney, to start investigations on all sexual harassments complaints filed against state legislators. He stated that he did not believe the sexual harassment complaints against Baumgardner despite the investigation stating the complaints were credible. Grantham voted against expelling Baumgardner from the state senate and refused to ask him to resign.

=== Local politics ===
Grantham served on the board of adjustments in Cañon City, Colorado, from 2005 to 2007, and as its chair in 2007. He elected to the city council from an at-large seat in 2007. He served as the chair of the Fremont County Republican Party from 2007 to 2010. Grantham announced on November 14, 2019, that he would run for a seat on the Fremont County Commission from the 1st district and was elected without opposition. During the 2022 United States Senate election he organized Eli Bremer's campaign in Fremont County.

== Political positions ==
Grantham stated that regulations should be enacted on the construction of mosques after a speech by Geert Wilders. He opposed the legalization of cannabis. He introduced legislation to allow business owners to use lethal force if they believed that their property was threatened. He received an F rating from NARAL Pro-Choice America. He stated that President Donald Trump's decision to appoint Brett Kavanaugh to the Supreme Court of the United States was "an excellent one".

He is against an attempt to have the Colorado Republican Party to eliminate the selection of candidates for the 2022 election through primaries stating that "This idiotic push from a small group of purists ranks as one of the worst ideas amongst the worst of the worst ideas in the entire history of insane ideas".

== Electoral history ==
2010 Colorado Senate 2nd district election
Primary election
| Party | Candidate | Votes | % |
|---|---|---|---|
| Republican | Kevin Grantham | 8,162 | 63.53% |
| Republican | Matt Heimerich | 4,686 | 36.47% |
| Total votes | | 12,848 | 100.00% |
General election
| Republican | Kevin Grantham | 25,902 | 58.23% |
| Democratic | Gloria Stultz | 18,581 | 41.77% |
| Total votes | | 44,483 | 100.00% |

2014 Colorado Senate 2nd district election
Primary election
| Party | Candidate | Votes | % |
|---|---|---|---|
| Republican | Kevin Grantham (incumbent) | 13,551 | 100.00% |
| Total votes | | 13,551 | 100.00% |
General election
| Republican | Kevin Grantham (incumbent) | 38,895 | 74.92% |
| Green | Martin T. Wirth | 13,019 | 25.08% |
| Total votes | | 51,914 | 100.00% |

2020 Fremont County Commission 1st district election
| Party | Candidate | Votes | % |
|---|---|---|---|
| Republican | Kevin Grantham | 20,054 | 100.00% |
| Total votes | | 20,054 | 100.00% |

2024 Fremont County Commission 1st district election
| Party | Candidate | Votes | % |
|---|---|---|---|
| Republican | Kevin Grantham | 19,613 | 100.00% |
| Total votes | | 19,613 | 100.00% |

Political offices
| Preceded by Bill Cadman | President of the Colorado Senate; 2017–2019 | Succeeded by Leroy Garcia |
