= Ted Bottiger =

American lawyer and politician

Member of the Washington House of Representatives from the 28th district
- In office 1965–1967

Member of the Washington House of Representatives from the 29th district
- In office 1967–1963

Member of the Washington State Senate from the 2nd district
- In office 1973 – November 20, 1987
- Preceded by: Bruce Wilson
- Succeeded by: Ken Madsen

Personal details
- Born: November 8, 1932 Tacoma, Washington
- Died: January 23, 2014 (aged 81)
- Party: Democratic

R. Ted Bottiger (November 8, 1932 – January 23, 2014) was an American lawyer and politician.

Born in Tacoma, Washington, Bottinger received his bachelor's degree from the University of Puget Sound and his law degree from the University of Washington School of Law. He practiced law in Puyallup, Washington. Bottiger then served in the Washington House of Representatives as a Democrat from 1965 to 1972. Bottinger then went on to serve in the Washington State Senate from 1973 to 1986. From 1987 until 1995, he was a member of the Northwest Power and Conservation Council, representing the state of Washington.
