= Dennis Hisey =

American politician

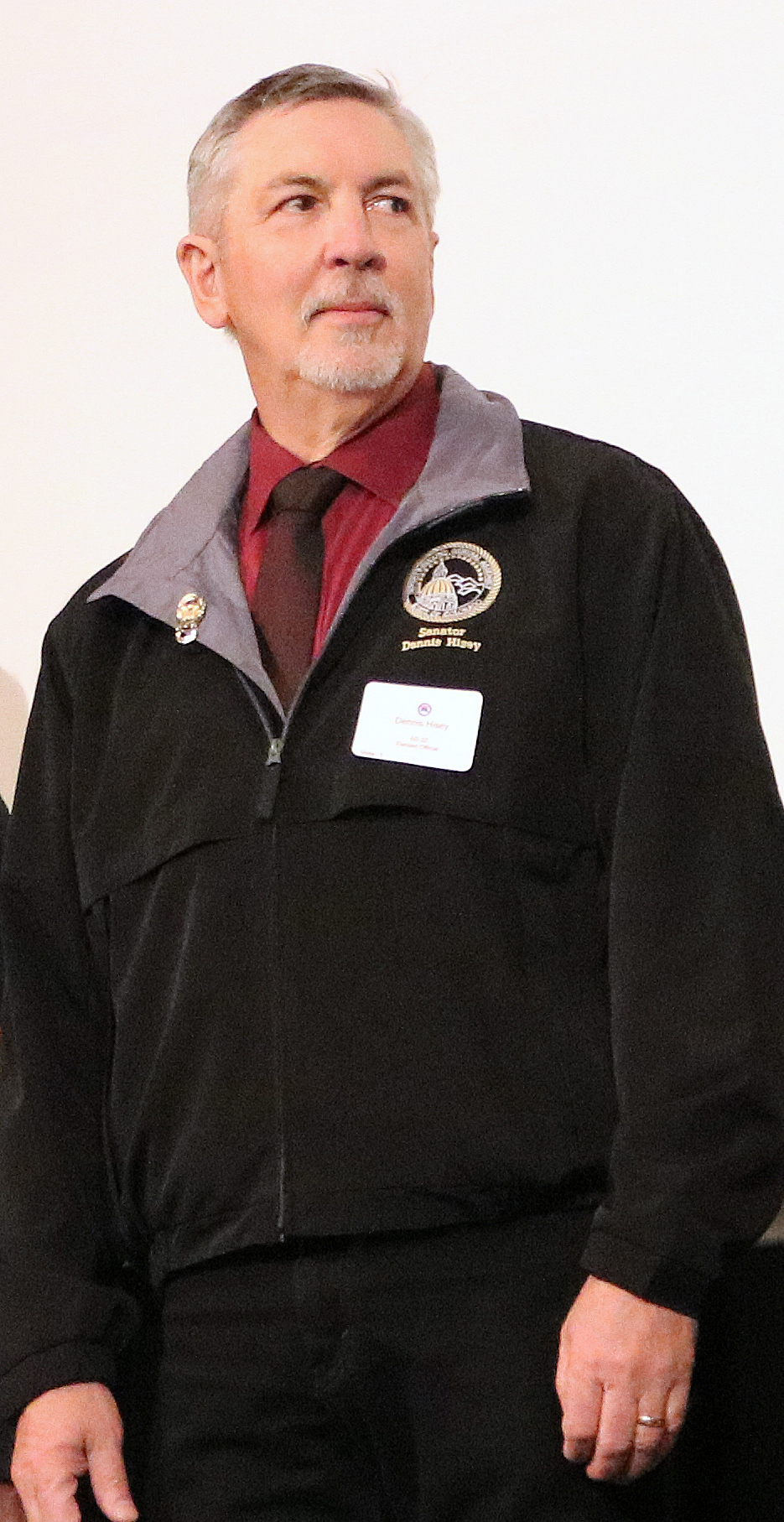
- Hisey in 2019

Member of the Colorado Senate from the 2nd district
- In office January 4, 2019 – January 9, 2023
- Preceded by: Kevin Grantham
- Succeeded by: Jim Smallwood

Personal details
- Party: Republican
- Spouse: Kathy

Dennis Hisey is a former state senator in the U.S. state of Colorado. Hisey was elected to the Colorado General Assembly as a Republican in November 2018. He represented Senate District 2, which encompasses Clear Creek, El Paso, Fremont, Park, and Teller Counties.

== Biography ==
Dennis grew up working on local farms, ranches and logging in rural Oregon. He obtained degrees from Oral Roberts University and Oregon State University, and moved to Colorado in the 1980s. Hisey has been a business owner for most of his adult life.

Hisey is married to his wife, Kathy, and has 5 children. They have 11 grandchildren.

Prior to being elected to the Colorado State Senate, Hisey was an El Paso County Commissioner from 2005 to 2017, and was elected Chairman for 6 of those years. As part of his duties on the County Commission, Hisey was a board member of the Pikes Peak Area Council of Governments and the Pikes Peak Rural Transportation Authority.

== Electoral history ==
=== 2018 Election ===
During his 2018 campaign for the Colorado State Senate, Hisey was endorsed by the National Rifle Association, the Colorado Springs Gazette, Colorado Medical Society, the National Federation of Independent Businesses, the Colorado Chamber of Commerce, the Colorado Dental Association, the Colorado Association of Realtors, the Colorado Association of Homebuilders, CARE for Co-ops, and others.

Due to the 2020 redistricting process, Hisey's residence moved from senate district 2 to senate district 11, where he ran for re-election. In the 2022 general election, Hisey lost to Tony Exum.

== Colorado State Senate ==
=== 2019 Legislative session ===
Senator Dennis Hisey was elected by the Republican caucus to serve as a member of the Joint Budget Committee, the year-round legislative committee that determines allocation of the State of Colorado’s budget.
