= Colorado's 2nd Senate district =

American legislative district

Colorado's 2nd State Senate district
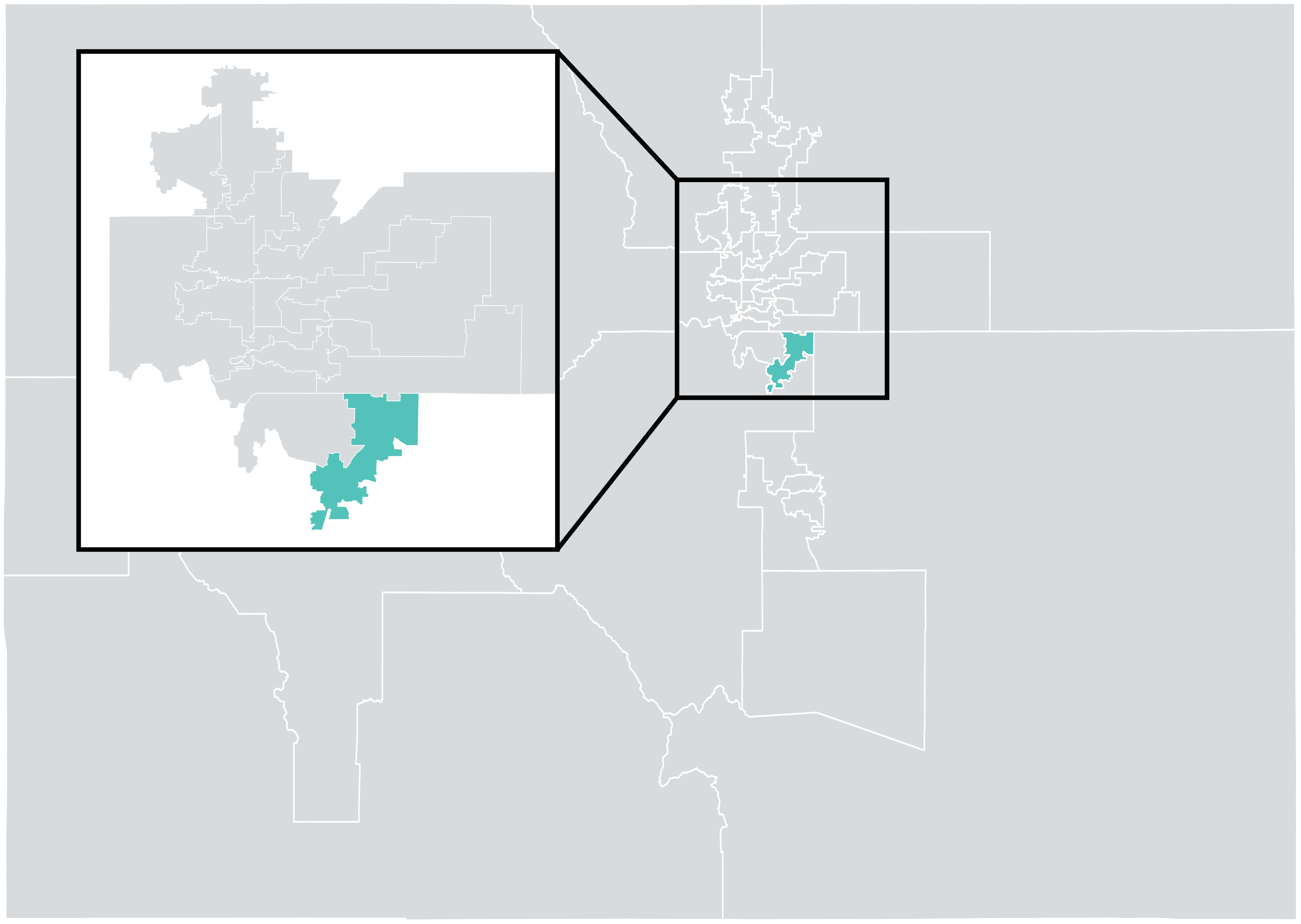
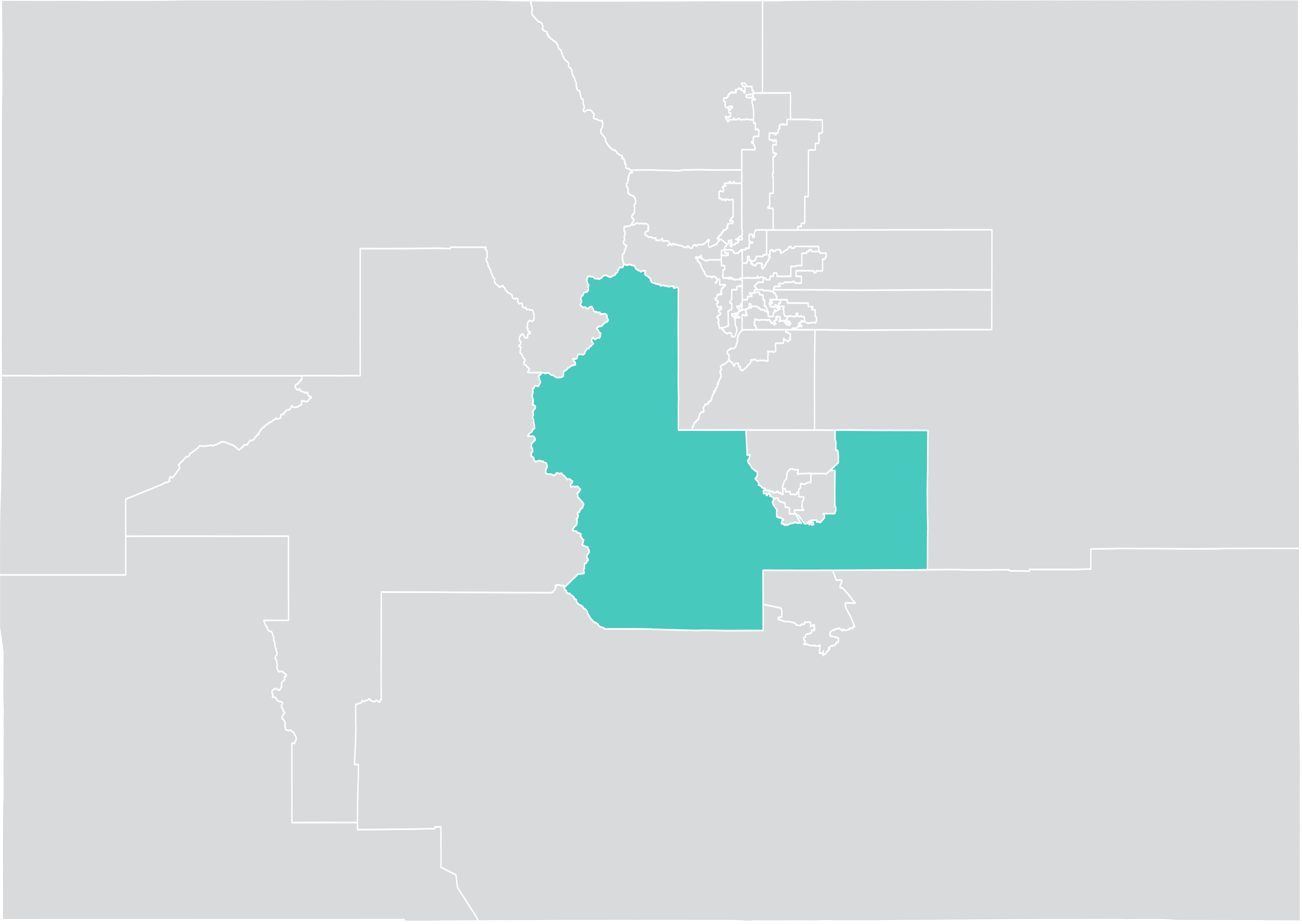
Senator
Lisa Frizell; R–Castle Rock
- Registration: 32.6% Republican; 15.8% Democratic; 49.6% No party preference
- Demographics: 78% White; 4% Black; 13% Hispanic; 1% Asian; 1% Native American; 1% Hawaiian/Pacific Islander; 3% Other
- Population (2018): 153,388
- Registered voters: 111,657

Colorado's 2nd Senate district is one of 35 districts in the Colorado Senate. It has been represented by Republican Lisa Frizell since January 2025. Prior to redistricting the district was represented by Republicans Dennis Hisey and Kevin Grantham.

== Geography ==
District 2 covers suburbs and exurbs of Colorado Springs and other parts of central Colorado, including all of Clear Creek, Fremont, Park, and Teller Counties and parts of El Paso County. Communities in the district include Idaho Springs, Georgetown, Fairplay, Cañon City, Florence, Lincoln Park, Penrose, Cripple Creek, Woodland Park, Fountain, Cascade-Chipita Park, Ellicott, Fort Carson, and parts of Security-Widefield.

The district overlaps with Colorado's 2nd and 5th congressional districts, and with the 13th, 18th, 19th, 20th, 21st, 39th, 47th, and 60th districts of the Colorado House of Representatives.

== Recent election results ==
Colorado state senators are elected to staggered four-year terms. The old 2nd district held elections in midterm years, but the new district drawn following the 2020 Census will hold elections in presidential years.

Following the 2020 redistricting, then-incumbent Senator Dennis Hisey was redrawn into 11th Senate District where he unsuccessfully ran for reelection. Jim Smallwood, who had previously served in the 4th Senate District, was drawn into District 2 and represented it until he was term limited in 2025.

Former State Representative Lisa Frizell was elected to the seat in the 2024 Colorado Senate election.

=== 2024 ===
2024 Colorado Senate election, District 2
Party	Candidate	Votes	%
Republican	Lisa Frizell	63,181	60.68
Democratic	Jennifer Brady	38,261	36.75
Libertarian	Caryn Ann Harlos	2,672	2.57
Total votes		104,114	100
Republican hold			

=== 2018 ===
2018 Colorado State Senate election, District 2
Primary election
Party	Candidate	Votes	%
Republican	Dennis Hisey	12,818	57.9
Republican	Stephanie Luck	9,302	42.1
Total votes		22,120	100
Democratic	Beth Hart Harz	6,813	74.1
Democratic	Dennis Obduskey	2,383	25.9
Total votes		9,196	100
General election
Republican	Dennis Hisey	42,531	65.3
Democratic	Beth Hart Harz	22,583	34.7
Total votes		65,114	100
Republican hold			

=== 2014 ===
2014 Colorado State Senate election, District 2
Party	Candidate	Votes	%
Republican	Kevin Grantham	38,895	74.9
Green	Martin Wirth	13,019	25.1
Total votes		51,914	100
Republican hold			

=== Federal and statewide results ===
Year	Office	Results
2020	President	Trump 62.7 – 34.2%
2018	Governor	Stapleton 60.8 – 34.3%
2016	President	Trump 64.1 – 27.9%
2014	Senate	Gardner 62.1 – 30.3%
2014	Governor	Beauprez 62.2 – 31.2%
2012	President	Romney 60.8 – 36.4%

== Senators ==
Representatives	Party	Years of service
Kenneth Kester	Republican	January 8, 2003 – January 12, 2011
Kevin Grantham	Republican	January 12, 2011 – January 4, 2019
Dennis Hisey	Republican	January 4, 2019 – January 9, 2023
Jim Smallwood	Republican	January 9, 2023 – January 8, 2025
Lisa Frizell	Republican	January 8, 2025 – present
