= Jim Smallwood =

American politician

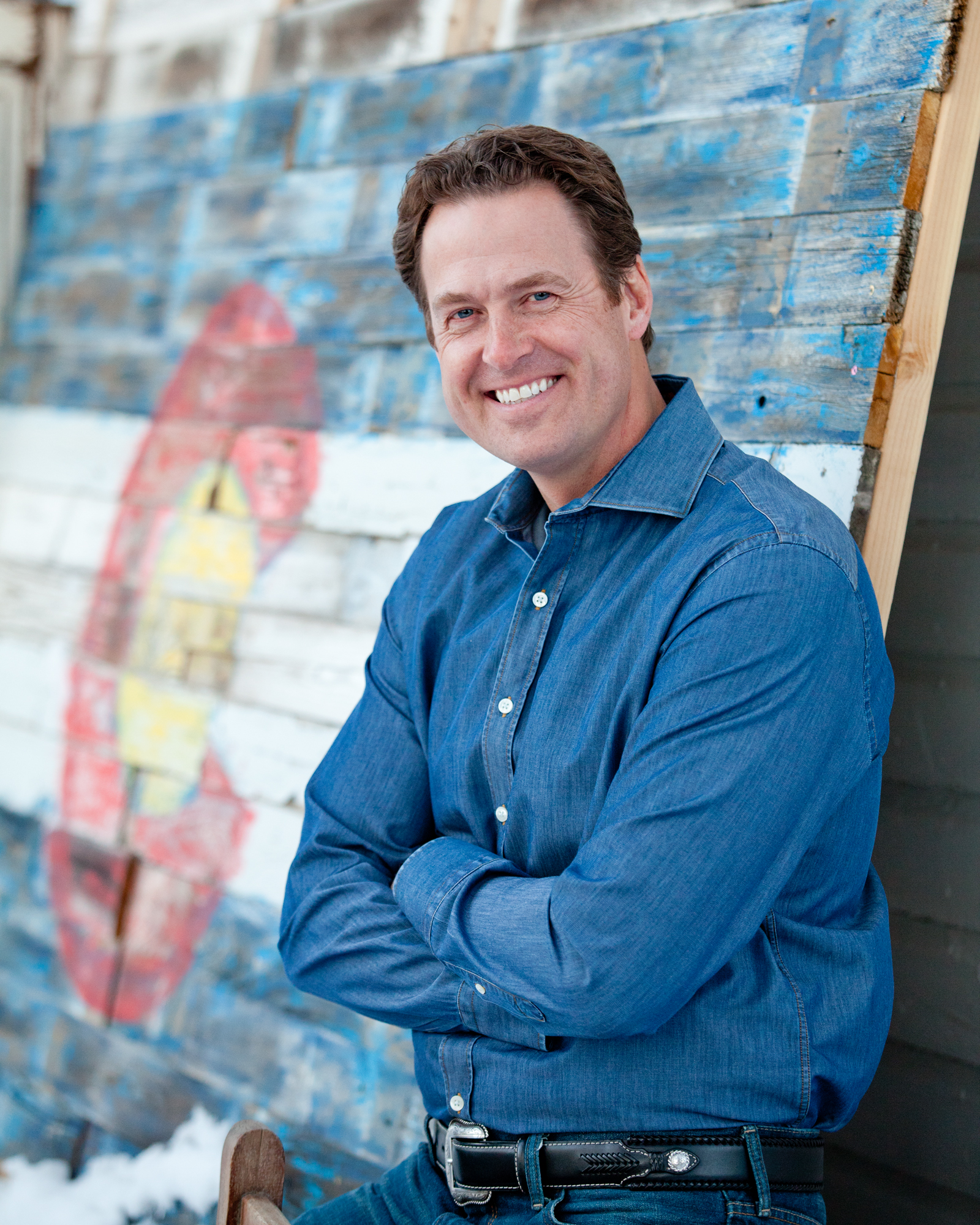

Member of the Colorado Senate from the 2nd district
- In office January 9, 2023 – January 8, 2025
- Preceded by: Dennis Hisey
- Succeeded by: Lisa Frizell

Member of the Colorado Senate from the 4th district
- In office January 11, 2017 – January 9, 2023
- Preceded by: Mark Scheffel
- Succeeded by: Mark Baisley

Personal details
- Born: 1971 (age 54–55) Fort Sill, Oklahoma
- Party: Republican
- Profession: Employee Benefits Consultant

James Smallwood Jr. (born c. 1971) is an American business consultant and politician first elected to the Colorado Senate in 2016. From 2023 to 2025, he represented State Senate District 2, which includes the communities of Castle Rock, Parker, The Pinery, Stonegate, and Grand View Estates in Douglas County. Prior to the 2020 reapportionment process that was implemented in 2023, Smallwood represented the former State Senate District 4 in Douglas County which encompassed the communities of Castle Rock, Larkspur, Parker, Franktown, and Castle Pines.

== Biography ==
Born in Fort Sill, Oklahoma, Smallwood spent his formative years in Manhattan, Kansas after his father's 22 years of service in the U.S. Army landed the family in Fort Riley, Kansas. He attended Fort Hays State University where he obtained his B.B.A. in Finance and met his wife of more than twenty years.

Shortly after college, Smallwood moved to Colorado and started a small insurance brokerage firm. He later grew this firm, expanding his knowledge base and services to include financial advising and employee benefit consulting. He is now president of Employee Benefits for Moody Insurance Agency, where he oversees a department which manages corporate clients and consults on employee benefits and cafeteria plan administration.

== Public service and associations ==
Smallwood was appointed to the Colorado Advisory Council for Persons with Disabilities by John Hickenlooper, and has also served on councils assembled by national and statewide insurers and trade associations.

== Legislative career ==
Smallwood never held public office prior to his election in 2016 to the Colorado State Senate.

During the Senate District 4 general election, Smallwood defeated his Democratic opponent, Christina Riegel, with 69.39% of the votes cast.

Given his history in health insurance and small business, Smallwood was designated Chair of the Senate Health and Human Services Committee and appointed to serve on the Senate Business, Labor, and Technology Committee.

Smallwood made medical care a focus in the 2018 Legislative Session. House Bill 1431 concerns managed care and aligns statutory provisions to reflect the current statewide managed care system, including the elimination of certain obsolete verbiage. House Bill 1211, is designed to control Medicaid Fraud; Senate Bill 27 enacted the Nurse Licensure Compact; Senate Bill 146 adds a layer of transparency for the consumer seeking treatment at free-standing emergency departments and Senate Bill 132 allows insurance companies to offer catastrophic health insurance plans to customers residing in Colorado. All of these bills were signed into law by the Governor.

== Electoral history ==
2016 Colorado Senate Republican primary election, District 4
Party	Candidate	Votes	%
Republican	Jim Smallwood	5,878	39.1
Republican	Benjamin Lyng	5,803	38.6
Republican	Jess Loban	3,368	22.4
Total votes		15,049	100

2016 Colorado State Senate election, District 4
Party	Candidate	Votes	%
Republican	Jim Smallwood	62,981	69.4
Democratic	Christina Riegel	27,779	30.6
Total votes		90,760	100
Republican hold			

2020 Colorado State Senate election, District 4
Party	Candidate	Votes	%
Republican	Jim Smallwood (incumbent)	73,832	62.3
Democratic	Elissa Flaumenhaft	41,526	35.0
Libertarian	Wayne Harlos	3,208	2.7
Total votes		118,566	100
Republican hold			
