= Washington's 16th legislative district =

Legislative district in Washington

Coordinates: 46°10′N 118°40′W

Washington's 16th legislative district map

Washington's 16th legislative district is one of forty-nine districts in Washington state for representation in the state legislature.

The district currently includes Walla Walla county, portions of Benton and Grant counties and all of Franklin county besides the most of Pasco southwest of U.S. Route 12, primarily along Interstate 182.

This largely rural district is represented by state senator Perry Dozier and state representatives Mark Klicker (position 1) and Skyler Rude (position 2), all Republicans.

== See also ==
- Washington Redistricting Commission
- Washington State Legislature
- Washington State Senate
- Washington House of Representatives
