= Senator Kopp =

Senator Kopp may refer to:

- Mike Kopp (born 1969), Colorado State Senate
- Quentin L. Kopp (born 1928), California State Senate
