= B.J. Nikkel =

American politician

Member of the Colorado House of Representatives from the 49th district
- In office January 22, 2009 – January 9, 2013
- Preceded by: Kevin Lundberg
- Succeeded by: Perry L. Buck

Personal details
- Party: Republican
- Spouse: Phil Nikkel
- Profession: Politician

Betty June "B.J." Nikkel was a state representative in the U.S. state of Colorado. She served in House leadership as Republican House Majority Whip, the fourth highest-ranking leader in the Colorado House of Representatives. Nikkel was appointed to the Colorado House of Representatives in January 2009 by vacancy committee to fill the vacancy caused by Kevin Lundberg's appointment to the Colorado State Senate. She was sworn in on January 22, 2009.

Nikkel represented House District 49, which includes all of rural Larimer County, Colorado, including the towns of Wellington, Timnath, Berthoud, and Estes Park, as well as the town of Windsor in Weld County, from 2009 to 2012.

== Biography ==
=== Early life ===
Nikkel is married to her husband, Phil and they have two grown sons, Jonathan and Christopher. She lives in unincorporated Larimer County at Carter Lake near Loveland, Colorado.

=== Political career ===
Rep. B.J. Nikkel was a Republican political activist and weekly columnist for the Fort Collins Coloradoan, before becoming a congressional staffer and then a senior staffer for former Rep. Marilyn Musgrave, serving as a district director for the congresswoman. Nikkel was also elected as a delegate to the 2004 Republican National Convention. She has also worked as a public relations consultant, and, at the time of her election to the legislature, was senior development director for the National Guard Association of Colorado. Nikkel has also served on the State Commission on Judicial Performance, the Larimer County Youth Services Advisory Board and has written a regular editorial column for the Fort Collins Coloradoan.

Nikkel is a past member of the American Legislative Exchange Council (ALEC), and has served as Colorado state leader. Nikkel presented at a national ALEC conference on her success in getting transparency enacted in Colorado. She is also a member of another legislative organization, National Council of State Legislatures (NCSL) and was part of a panel on child welfare issues at their national conference.

== Legislative career ==
=== 2009 appointment ===
Nikkel's appointment to the state house stemmed from a series of vacancies beginning with state senator Steve Johnson's election as a Larimer County commissioner in November 2008. Given Rep. Kevin Lundberg's expressed interest in being appointed to Johnson's state senate seat, Nikkel expressed interest in assuming Lundberg's house seat shortly after Johnson's November election. Nikkel had previously expressed interest in succeeding the term-limited Lundberg in 2010.

Describing herself on Facebook as a "conservative Republican, but independent thinker", Nikkel was also described as a "conservative centrist" and "a proud, unabashed and fiscally conservative Republican". Nikkel was appointed to the vacant seat over Windsor resident Ray Walter by a vote of 8–2 of a Republican party vacancy committee on January 17. Nikkel was sworn in as a state representative on January 22, 2009, boosting the percentage of women serving in the General Assembly to 40 percent, the highest proportion of all U.S. state legislatures.

=== 2009 legislative session ===
When Nikkel was sworn in she took over the committee assignments for her predecessor on Health and Human Services and State, Military and Veterans Affairs Committees. After the 2009 session ended, Nikkel was reappointed to serve on the House Judiciary Committee and remained on State, Military and Veterans Affairs Committee. She was also appointed to serve on the Colorado Channel Authority which oversees the televised proceedings of the legislature. Rep. Nikkel was also appointed to serve on the Joint Select Committee on Child Welfare as a result of children dying while in the care of the state and was charged with investigating these deaths in a series of special hearings.

Although Nikkel was appointed to the legislature after the start of the 2009 session, she saw passage of three of the four bills she sponsored during the 2009 Legislative Session which were signed by the governor after the end of session. A Windsor Beacon editorial called her a "breath of fresh air" and cited her accomplishment as a freshman in the minority party as being "pretty impressive when you consider that Nikkel just began her State House career in January without being elected." Subsequently, she passed six bills and five Resolutions during the 2010 session. In the 2011 and 2012 legislative session, Nikkel passed seven bills and three Resolutions each year.

2009 Legislation

HB09-1290 - National Guard Tuition Assistance - increased the amount of money in the tuition assistance program for members of the Colorado National Guard.

HB09-1306 – “Youth Corrections Reporting Requirements” - would have increased accountability over state youth corrections facilities, which reportedly had problems with correctly reporting child abuse within the facilities. It would have made it a crime for counselors at youth detention facilities to ignore abuse allegations and for administrators to alter reports. The bill was fought by the Colorado Department of Human Services which oversees youth corrections and was killed in committee.

HB09-1291 – “Veterans Information Resource Clearinghouse" - provides a one-stop shopping information resource center including a website and "800" phone number for veterans to help them easily find all the information they need on various public, private and government programs that have been vetted, and the services available to them. Rep. Nikkel worked with United Veterans Committee on the bill.

HB09-1288 - “The Colorado Taxpayer Transparency Act” - Nikkel considered this bill her "most important bill of the 2009 legislative session." The Transparency Act puts the state’s checkbook online so taxpayers can view expenditures and revenues. Nikkel also said she believes "taxpayers have a right to know how and where the state spends our taxpayer dollars without having to pay hundreds or thousands of dollars for Colorado Open Records Act requests." The bill passed both houses unanimously and was signed by the governor.

=== 2010 legislative session ===
Rep. B.J. Nikkel is best known for the following: She supported Colorado's military and veterans, sponsoring legislation to help them. She also advocated for stopping the over-criminalization of Colorado youth. In addition, she voted to pass the civil unions bill out of Judiciary Committee so it could be heard by the entire House of Representatives. She also enacted two pieces of legislation that required the state to post expenditure and revenue data of state departments online. The first was the "Transparency Online Project" and is linked to the state's website and legislative website.

2010 Legislation

HB10-1140 Construction of National Guard Readiness Centers – The bill creates Readiness Centers in various locations around the state for Colorado Army and Air National Guard. This bill funds and will create Readiness Centers for the Colorado National Guard in Windsor, Grand Junction and Alamosa. Several hundred jobs will be created from the projects in these cities.

HB10-1288 Commercial Broker’s Lien – This bill creates a Commercial Real Estate Brokers’ Lien. Commercial real estate brokers who have difficulty collecting hundreds of thousands of dollars of fees owed to them. The bill gives the ability to file liens on properties after multiple attempts at recovery and mediation occur.

HB10-1078 Exclusion of Private Information on State’s Transparency Online Project and providing Appeal Process on Excluded Info – Concerns the exclusion and protection of private information on the state’s transparency online project (TOP) I created last year through passing a bill that put the state’s expenditures and revenue data online. This bill also creates a process for appealing exclusions of other information.

HB10-1259 Conforming Annexation Act to State Constitution – this bill helped conform provisions of the state annexation act to the state constitution so that they are uniform and annexation statute now requires that the constitution must also be referred to (in addition to statute) in annexation cases.

SB10-41 Technical Modifications to Statutory Provisions of Campaign Finance - The bill harmonizes legislation and cleans up language in a bill passed in 2009 and conforms the registration requirements for issue committees involved in recall elections to the requirements of other types of issue committees for campaign finance reporting purposes. Also allows the Secretary of State to require electronic filing of campaign finance reports.

HJR10-1004 Military Appreciation Day - Honored Colorado veterans and members of the military with various Resolutions and tributes and displays at the capitol.

HJR10-1012 - CSU Founders Day 140th Anniversary - Celebrated the 140 anniversary of Colorado State University.

SJR10-26 - Justin Bauer Memorial Highway - Changed a local highway going through Berthoud, Colorado to honor a local fallen hero who died in action and served his country well.

=== 2010 election ===
On November 2, 2010, Nikkel won election with a 60% majority. With the November 2010 election, Colorado Republicans won the Majority in the House of Representatives and Nikkel was then elected by the party as House Majority Whip. She ran unopposed for the position and helped lead the legislative agenda for the House Republican Majority.

Rep. Nikkel has received various awards and commendation for helping Colorado Veterans, the Colorado National Guard, as well as the other military installations in Colorado. Her HB10-1140 created new armories, called "Readiness Centers" across the state to help with the updated mission the Colorado National Guard faces at the state and federal levels. She was a prime sponsor annually of Military Appreciation Day at the state capitol and has sponsored legislation to honor fallen soldiers and create a license plate doing so. She also enacted legislation to give Colorado National Guardsmen tuition assistance and helped veterans by creating a “One Stop Shop” for veterans to find information online that they need.

=== 2011 legislative session ===
On top of her duties as House Majority Whip, Nikkel continued serving on House Judiciary Committee and was also appointed to the Legislative Council. In addition she served as Vice Chairman for the School Discipline Task Force which would examine zero tolerance policies in Colorado schools.

In 2011 she sponsored legislation putting the Colorado Department of Transportation's (CDOT) expenditures and revenues online.

2011 Legislation

HB11-1002 - Transparency for Colorado Department of Transportation - CDOT was not included in Nikkel's 2010 bill creating the Transparency Online Project TOP because CDOT uses a different computer system. This bill created a new website CDOT created which is linked to TOP and puts CDOT's expenditures and revenues online.

HB11-1095 - Protecting the Security of the Secretary of State's Website - this bill requires that certain security measures are taken so that the SOS online business filing section will not be open to fraudulent activities.

HB11-1148 - Disclosure of Health Worker Employment Information - allows employers to swap information about employees seeking employment in another facility. This bill came about as a result of an employee of a facility who had issues with drug use, was hired by another facility and subsequently used needles she used on herself, on patients exposing them to hepatitis.

HB11-1239 - New Crime Fiscal Note Analysis - If a legislative measure creates a new crime or changes elements of existing statute, a fiscal analysis must occur to show cost and it must also show whether the proposed crime created can be charged under Colorado law. It must compare it to other offenses already on the books to ensure laws are not duplicated or must show whether the offense could be charged under a different criminal statute. It must also include analysis of the behavior the proposal intends to address.

HB11-1273 - Healthcare Opportunity and Patient Empowerment Act - The HOPE Act - this bill allowed for the creation of an interstate compact so that Colorado could Opt Out of "ObamaCare." It was killed in the Senate.

SB11-133 - Discipline in Public Schools - This bill allowed for the creation of a Task Force funded by Legislative Council to study the effects of zero tolerance policies and write legislation to solve the problem of over-criminalization of youth in Colorado.

HJR11-1015 - Child Abuse Prevention Month - Designated April and Child Abuse Prevention month.

HJR11-1010 - CSU Founders Day - celebrated Founders Day and coordinated efforts with Colorado State University to bring displays to the capitol regarding their academic programs. Brought the CSU Choir to sing for the legislature.

=== 2012 legislative session ===
During the 2012 Legislation Session, Nikkel supported SB12-02, a civil unions measure, and voted with her Democratic colleagues to allow the passage of the bill out of Judiciary Committee, thereby allowing the bill to be heard by the legislature. While supporting civil unions, she acknowledged the importance of protecting the Colorado Constitutional Amendment defining marriage as between one man and one woman.

Nikkel's attempt to put Department of Higher Education information online failed, along with roughly 30 other measures, when a partisan impasse arose regarding the civil unions bill and the Republican Speaker, Frank McNulty, allowed all pending legislation to die so as to prevent debate on the bill. The delay triggered a special legislative session. In the special session of the General Assembly, Speaker McNulty sent the civil unions bill to the conservative State, Veterans and Military Affairs Committee which functioned as a "kill committee," permanently avoiding a vote by the House. Most remaining measures followed normal procedures.

During the 2012 session, Nikkel worked work to help protect Colorado youth and stop the over-criminalization of them in the state. Nikkel's Direct File Reform bill HB12-1271 was passed in 2012. It was fought by the Colorado District Attorney's Council and the Attorney General but Nikkel passed it with broad bi-partisan support and the bill was signed into law. It reversed legislation exacted in 1993 which gave district attorneys sole power and discretion to charge youth as adults. Nikkel's bill took away that sole discretion and instead required that youth get a hearing so that "judicial review" and "due process" occurred.

She helped enact SB12-046, the Discipline in Public Schools bill to get rid of "zero tolerance" policies in Colorado schools that were giving youth criminal records for minor problems. The bill was also killed during the civil unions "impasse" in the 2012 session but was resurrected and combined into the 2012 School Finance Act which was passed during the subsequent 2012 Special Session that Governor Hickenlooper called for to deal with important legislation that was killed.

2012 Legislation

HB12-1271 - Juvenile Direct File Limitations - the bill reformed the law which allows district attorneys to charge youth as adults and "directly file" them into adult court. HB1271 limited the offenses whereby youth could be charged as adults to only the most heinous crimes. It required use of judicial review in all cases where youth could be charged so that due process is preserved, allowing both sides of a case to be heard by a judge. Prior to that, youth did not get a hearing, and instead, only got a sentencing hearing.

HB12-1023 - Fallen Heroes Vehicle License Plate - created a license plate any Coloradan could purchase which required some proceeds go to a family survivors group to help families of fallen law enforcement officers. The intent of the plate is to pay tribute to any fallen hero, including soldiers and firefighters.

HB12-1146 - Dropout Recovery Act - allowed the use of district monies that already exist to pay for a program to help high school dropouts between ages 17–21, or those at risk of dropping out, to enroll in a program at a local community college where they can get their diploma and concurrently enroll in college classes.

HB12-1289- Auto Insurance Complaint Process - streamlined the process for consumers of auto insurance and providers so that issues relating to their insurance could be handled via mail, rather than going through a quasi judicial process.

SB12-46 - Discipline in Public Schools - As a result of the findings of the task force from SB11-133 which included teachers, school administrators, law enforcement, restorative justice experts, counselors and legislators, this bill revamped the policies in Colorado where teachers were required to implement zero tolerance policies which over-criminalized Colorado youth. This bill was killed with other bills at end of session when an "impasse" was reached over civil union bill, but was resurrected and tacked onto Rep. Tom Massey's 2012 School Finance Act in the Special 2012 Session.

HJR12-1008 - Fallen Soldiers Resolution - honored fallen Colorado soldiers during the Military Appreciation Day at the capitol - those who died while protecting their country.

HJR12-1011 - CSU Founders Day - honored Colorado State University as a flagship university in Colorado.

SJR12-028 - Child Abuse Prevention Month - highlighted April as Child Abuse Prevention month.

HB12-1252 - Transparency of Higher Education - This bill was killed with other bills at end of session when an "impasse" was reached over civil union bill. It would have required institutions of higher learning to post information online regarding their expenditure and revenue data.

=== 2012 election ===
In the 2012 General Election, Representative Nikkel announced she would not seek reelection. She was succeeded by Republican Perry L. Buck.

== Life after politics ==
In 2013, Nikkel was a signatory to an amicus curiae brief submitted to the Supreme Court in support of same-sex marriage during the Hollingsworth v. Perry case.
