= Mark Hillman =

American politician

Treasurer of Colorado
- Acting
- In office June 9, 2005 – March 27, 2006
- Preceded by: Mike Coffman
- Succeeded by: Mike Coffman

Minority Leader of the Colorado Senate
- In office January 2005 – June 9, 2005
- Preceded by: Joan Fitz-Gerald
- Succeeded by: Norma Anderson (acting)

Majority Leader of the Colorado Senate
- In office January 7, 2004 – January 2005
- Preceded by: Norma Anderson
- Succeeded by: Ken Gordon

Personal details
- Born: Mark Douglas Hillman; May 24, 1967 (age 59) Burlington, Colorado, U.S.
- Party: Republican
- Education: Colby Community College; Morgan Community College; Regis University

Mark Douglas Hillman is an American politician. He was elected to the Colorado Senate in 1998. He served as Majority Leader from 2003 to 2004 and Minority Leader in 2005 before serving as State Treasurer from 2005 to 2006. He is a member of the Republican Party and was elected Republican National Committeeman on May 31, 2008.

== Early life ==
Hillman grew up working his parents' farm in Burlington on Colorado's eastern plains. During high school, he took a part-time job with his hometown newspaper, the Burlington Record. After graduating from Burlington High School in 1985, he became a full-time sports editor, news reporter, photographer, and "jack of all trades." In 1994, Hillman left the paper to work the family farm.

== Education ==
Hillman took classes at Colby Community College in Kansas, Morgan Community College, and Regis University. He did not complete a degree.

== Political career ==
=== Colorado State Senate ===
Hillman announced his candidacy for the State Senate in late 1997. After winning, he became the senator from the state's largest legislative district, covering 12 counties and more than 21,000 square miles (54,000 km^{2}). Hillman was elected to leadership posts for five of his seven years in the Senate, including both Majority Leader and Minority Leader.

Hillman received National Legislator of the Year honors from the American Legislative Exchange Council (ALEC), "Taxpayer Champion" from the Colorado Union of Taxpayers, and other awards in Colorado, including recognition from the Colorado Farm Bureau, the National Federation of Independent Business, the Colorado Civil Justice League, and the Colorado Association of Commerce and Industry.

=== Colorado State Treasurer ===
Hillman was appointed as Colorado's State Treasurer in June 2005 by Governor Bill Owens.

=== Republican National Committeeman ===
At the Republican State Convention on May 31, 2008, former United States Senator William L. Armstrong nominated Hillman for Republican National Committeeman, calling him "one of the greatest legislators in the history of Colorado." Hillman won and replaced United States Senate candidate Bob Schaffer as one of Colorado's three Republican National Committeemen.

== Personal life ==
Mark married Heidi Horvath on July 16, 2005.

Colorado Senate
Preceded by Norma Anderson	Majority Leader of the Colorado Senate; 2004–2005	Succeeded by Ken Gordon
Preceded by Joan Fitz-Gerald	Minority Leader of the Colorado Senate; 2005	Succeeded by Norma Anderson; Acting
Political offices
Preceded by Mike Coffman	Treasurer of Colorado; Acting; 2005–2006	Succeeded by Mike Coffman
