= Norma Anderson =

American politician

Minority Leader of the Colorado Senate
- Acting
- In office June 22, 2005 – August 22, 2005
- Preceded by: Mark Hillman
- Succeeded by: Andy McElhany

Majority Leader of the Colorado Senate
- In office January 8, 2003 – January 7, 2004
- Preceded by: Bill Thiebaut
- Succeeded by: Mark Hillman

Member of the Colorado Senate
- In office January 13, 1999 – January 3, 2006
- Preceded by: Bill Schroeder
- Succeeded by: Kiki Traylor
- Constituency: 22nd

Majority Leader of the Colorado House of Representatives
- In office January 1997 – January 13, 1999
- Preceded by: Tim Foster
- Succeeded by: Doug Dean

Member of the Colorado House of Representatives
- In office January 14, 1987 – January 13, 1999
- Preceded by: James Moore
- Succeeded by: Rob Fairbank
- Constituency: 52nd (1987–1993); 30th (1993–1999)

Personal details
- Born: July 6, 1932 (age 94) Elyria, Ohio, U.S.
- Party: Republican (before 2021); Independent (2021–present)
- Education: University of Denver

Norma Anderson is an American former state legislator from Colorado. She previously represented Jefferson County in the Colorado House of Representatives from 1987 to 1998, and was a member of the Colorado Senate from 1999 until her resignation in 2006 to spend more time with her family. A former Republican, she left the party in 2021 over its support for Donald Trump.

Anderson was the first woman to serve as majority leader in the Colorado House and Colorado Senate. A pre-school was named for her and she is a member of the Jefferson County Historical Commission Hall of Fame. She has lived in Lakewood, Colorado, and has three children.

== Opposition to Trump ==
In 2021, Anderson left the Republican Party over its support for Donald Trump.

Anderson was a plaintiff in Trump v. Anderson, a court case that aimed to bar former President Trump, a candidate in the 2024 presidential election, from appearing on the Colorado ballot by invoking the 14th Amendment's insurrection clause.

Trump was ultimately disqualified from the 2024 Colorado Republican presidential primary; marking the first time a presidential candidate had ever been barred from running because of the clause. The court stayed its ruling, pending review by the U.S. Supreme Court. On March 4, 2024, the Supreme Court ruled that Trump could not be removed from the ballot, stating that individual states cannot determine eligibility under Section 3 for federal office holders, and that such power is conferred exclusively to the federal government.

Colorado House of Representatives
Preceded by James E. Moore	Member of the Colorado House of Representatives from the 52nd district 1987–1993	Succeeded by Bernhard E. “Bernie” Strom
Preceded by Guillermo A. DeHerrera	Member of the Colorado House of Representatives from the 30th district 1993–1999	Succeeded by Rob Fairbank
Preceded by Tim Foster	Majority Leader of the Colorado House of Representatives; 1997–1999	Succeeded by Doug Dean
Colorado Senate
Preceded by William R. “Bill” Schroeder	Member of the Colorado Senate from the 22nd district 1999–2006	Succeeded by Kathleen K. "Kiki" Traylor
Preceded by Bill Thiebaut	Majority Leader of the Colorado Senate; 2003–2004	Succeeded by Mark Hillman
Preceded by Mark Hillman	Minority Leader of the Colorado Senate; Acting; 2005	Succeeded by Andy McElhany
