= 2024 Colorado Republican presidential primary =

- March 5, 2024

37 Republican National Convention delegates

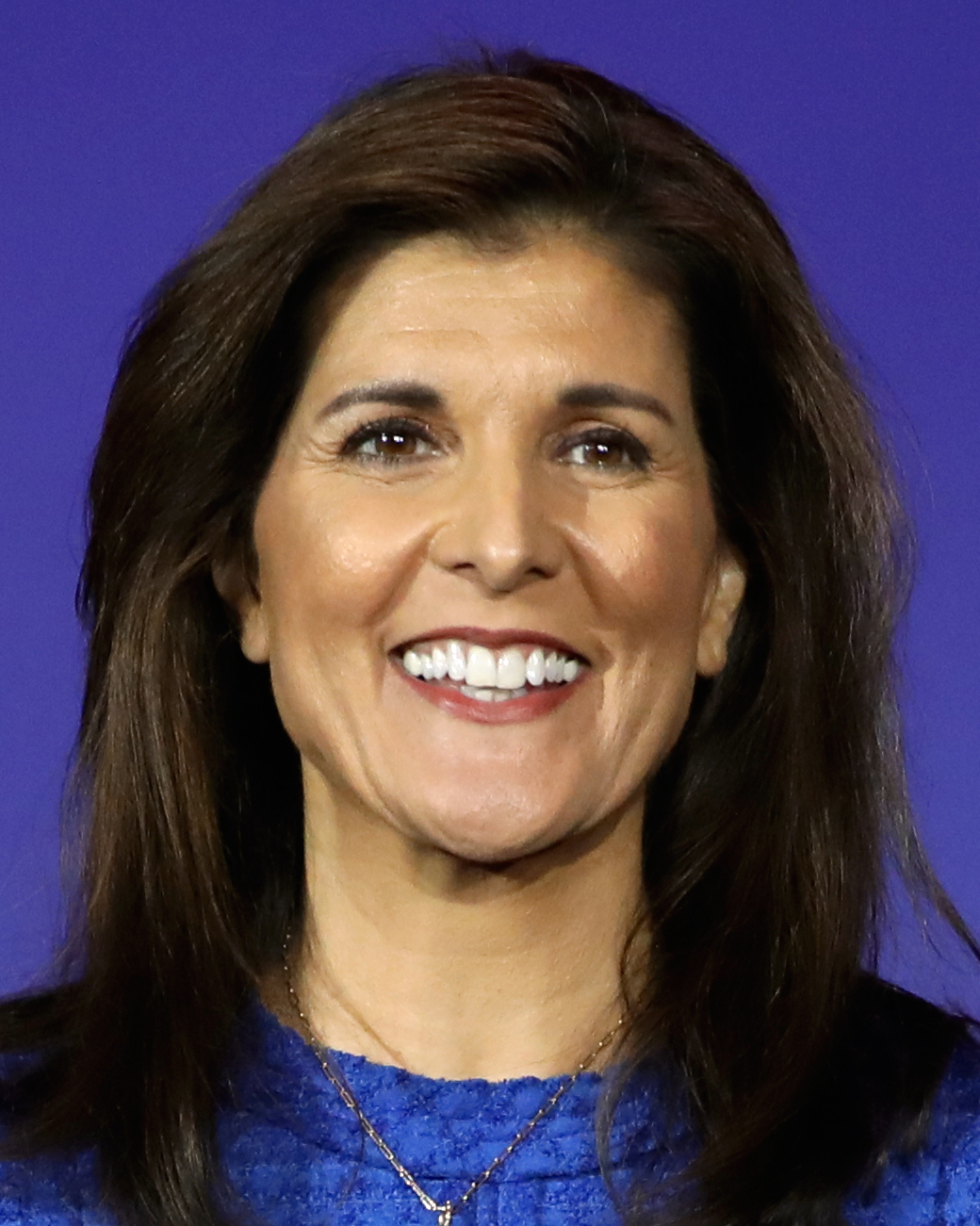
Candidate	Donald Trump	Nikki Haley
Home state	Florida	South Carolina
Delegate count	24	12
Popular vote	555,863	291,615
Percentage	63.46%	33.29%
County results
Trump
40 – 50%
50 – 60%
60 – 70%
70 – 80%
80 – 90%
Haley
40 – 50%
50 – 60%

The 2024 Colorado Republican presidential primary was held on March 5, 2024, as part of the Republican Party primaries for the 2024 presidential election. 37 delegates to the 2024 Republican National Convention were allocated on a winner-take-most basis. The contest was held on Super Tuesday alongside primaries in 14 other states. Donald J. Trump won in 57 of the counties. Nikki Haley won the majority of the vote in six counties, including Denver, Boulder, Summit, Pitkin, San Miguel, and San Juan. She also won a plurality of the vote in Routt County.

== Attempted disqualification of Trump ==
On December 19, 2023, the Colorado Supreme Court reversed a lower court decision that the president of the United States is not an Officer of the United States while upholding the other court's holding that former President Donald Trump had engaged in insurrection by inciting the January 6 United States Capitol attack, and was thus disqualified from the presidency under Section 3 of the 14th Amendment and ordered that Trump be removed from the 2024 Colorado Republican presidential primary ballot. The Colorado Republican Party appealed to the United States Supreme Court on December 27, thus putting the state courts decision is on hold until the ruling of the United States Supreme Court. The disqualification was also appealed to the United States Supreme Court by Trump's legal counsel on January 3. Colorado Secretary of State Jena Griswold confirmed on January 5 that Trump was on the Republican ballot. The Supreme Court ruled on March 4 that Trump would not be removed from the ballot.

== Endorsements ==
Ron DeSantis (withdrawn)

State senator

- Larry Liston, District 10
Tim Scott (withdrawn)

Former U.S. Senator

- Cory Gardner, (2015–2021)
Donald Trump

U.S. Representative

- Lauren Boebert, CO-03 (2021–present)

Former state legislator

- Kevin Lundberg, CO Senate (2009–2019)

Party official

- Dave Williams, Colorado GOP chair (2023–present); member of the CO House (2017–2023)

Former county official

- Tina Peters, County Clerk and Recorder of Mesa County (2019–2023)

== Results ==
Colorado Republican primary, March 5, 2024
Candidate	Votes	Percentage	Actual delegate count		
Candidate	Votes	Percentage	Bound	Unbound	Total
Donald Trump	555,863	63.46%	24		
Nikki Haley	291,615	33.29%	12		
Ron DeSantis (withdrawn)	12,672	1.45%			
Chris Christie (withdrawn)	7,188	0.82%			
Vivek Ramaswamy (withdrawn)	5,113	0.58%			
Ryan Binkley (withdrawn)	2,220	0.25%			
Asa Hutchinson (withdrawn)	1,269	0.14%			
Total:	875,940	100.00%	36	1	37

=== Results by county ===
2024 Colorado Republican primary (results per county)
County	Donald Trump		Nikki Haley		Ron DeSantis		Chris Christie		Vivek Ramaswamy		Ryan Binkley		Asa Hutchinson		Total votes cast
County	Votes	%	Votes	%	Votes	%	Votes	%	Votes	%	Votes	%	Votes	%	Total votes cast
Adams	34,909	69.95%	13,432	26.91%	664	1.33%	391	0.78%	298	0.60%	146	0.29%	69	0.14%	49,909
Alamosa	1,678	74.81%	481	21.44%	34	1.52%	22	0.98%	12	0.53%	7	0.31%	9	0.40%	2,243
Arapahoe	45,351	59.31%	28,548	37.33%	1,158	1.51%	627	0.82%	485	0.63%	187	0.24%	110	0.14%	76,466
Archuleta	2,521	67.17%	1,108	29.52%	64	1.71%	26	0.69%	22	0.59%	7	0.19%	5	0.13%	3,753
Baca	976	87.93%	112	10.09%	12	1.08%	5	0.45%	3	0.27%	1	0.09%	1	0.09%	1,110
Bent	779	82.09%	144	15.17%	14	1.48%	4	0.42%	6	0.63%	1	0.11%	1	0.11%	949
Boulder	14,355	41.64%	18,808	54.56%	428	1.24%	474	1.37%	250	0.73%	83	0.24%	77	0.22%	34,475
Broomfield	6,190	52.19%	5,234	44.13%	156	1.32%	143	1.21%	89	0.75%	30	0.25%	19	0.16%	11,861
Chaffee	2,883	60.20%	1,762	36.79%	72	1.50%	34	0.71%	17	0.35%	13	0.27%	8	0.17%	4,789
Cheyenne	526	87.52%	62	10.32%	8	1.33%	1	0.17%	2	0.33%	2	0.33%	0	0.00%	601
Clear Creek	1,007	61.22%	585	35.56%	31	1.88%	8	0.49%	9	0.55%	2	0.12%	3	0.18%	1,645
Conejos	1,043	80.79%	215	16.65%	17	1.32%	5	0.39%	4	0.31%	4	0.31%	3	0.23%	1,291
Costilla	304	76.57%	81	20.40%	4	1.01%	6	1.51%	0	0.00%	1	0.25%	1	0.25%	397
Crowley	722	84.35%	104	12.15%	14	1.64%	6	0.70%	2	0.23%	8	0.93%	0	0.00%	856
Custer	1,434	73.28%	474	24.22%	28	1.43%	9	0.46%	6	0.31%	3	0.15%	3	0.15%	1,957
Delta	6,696	76.14%	1,839	20.91%	124	1.41%	55	0.63%	34	0.39%	21	0.24%	25	0.28%	8,794
Denver	19,525	43.09%	24,160	53.31%	487	1.07%	560	1.24%	363	0.80%	122	0.27%	100	0.22%	45,317
Dolores	607	88.61%	68	9.93%	5	0.73%	2	0.29%	1	0.15%	2	0.29%	0	0.00%	685
Douglas	50,347	60.96%	29,512	35.73%	1,273	1.54%	659	0.80%	514	0.62%	192	0.23%	90	0.11%	82,587
Eagle	3,205	49.60%	3,076	47.60%	69	1.07%	58	0.90%	33	0.51%	10	0.15%	11	0.17%	6,462
El Paso	86,181	67.23%	38,024	29.66%	2,049	1.60%	794	0.62%	676	0.53%	294	0.23%	166	0.13%	128,184
Elbert	7,616	78.65%	1,785	18.43%	155	1.60%	46	0.48%	58	0.60%	17	0.18%	6	0.06%	9,683
Fremont	8,697	78.57%	2,102	18.99%	139	1.26%	59	0.53%	43	0.39%	21	0.19%	8	0.07%	11,069
Garfield	6,048	65.21%	2,932	31.61%	129	1.39%	70	0.75%	53	0.57%	26	0.28%	17	0.18%	9,275
Gilpin	776	65.65%	371	31.39%	12	1.02%	14	1.18%	5	0.42%	3	0.25%	1	0.08%	1,182
Grand	2,047	62.20%	1,121	34.06%	49	1.49%	40	1.22%	23	0.70%	9	0.27%	2	0.06%	3,291
Gunnison	1,441	51.82%	1,245	44.77%	38	1.37%	36	1.29%	15	0.54%	2	0.07%	4	0.14%	2,781
Hinsdale	173	64.55%	85	31.72%	3	1.12%	1	0.37%	2	0.75%	3	1.12%	1	0.37%	268
Huerfano	1,156	76.56%	325	21.52%	13	0.86%	7	0.46%	5	0.33%	1	0.07%	3	0.20%	1,510
Jackson	364	76.31%	102	21.38%	3	0.63%	3	0.63%	1	0.21%	3	0.63%	1	0.21%	477
Jefferson	57,500	57.87%	38,327	38.58%	1,460	1.47%	969	0.98%	622	0.63%	301	0.30%	174	0.18%	99,353
Kiowa	421	85.74%	60	12.22%	6	1.22%	1	0.20%	1	0.20%	1	0.20%	1	0.20%	491
Kit Carson	1,727	86.13%	230	11.47%	32	1.60%	5	0.25%	5	0.25%	4	0.20%	2	0.10%	2,005
La Plata	6,165	58.78%	3,994	38.08%	139	1.33%	92	0.88%	52	0.50%	30	0.29%	16	0.15%	10,488
Lake	482	66.67%	220	30.43%	11	1.52%	7	0.97%	1	0.14%	2	0.28%	0	0.00%	723
Larimer	35,268	58.79%	22,566	37.62%	987	1.65%	557	0.93%	351	0.59%	170	0.28%	89	0.15%	59,988
Las Animas	1,963	81.12%	397	16.40%	25	1.03%	12	0.50%	15	0.62%	4	0.17%	4	0.17%	2,420
Lincoln	1,137	84.41%	180	13.36%	15	1.11%	4	0.30%	6	0.45%	2	0.15%	3	0.22%	1,347
Logan	4,154	81.47%	784	15.38%	74	1.45%	33	0.65%	24	0.47%	23	0.45%	7	0.14%	5,099
Mesa	25,982	69.64%	10,129	27.15%	588	1.58%	301	0.81%	179	0.48%	80	0.21%	50	0.13%	37,309
Mineral	247	73.73%	77	22.99%	4	1.19%	5	1.49%	2	0.60%	0	0.00%	0	0.00%	335
Moffat	2,684	85.13%	405	12.84%	33	1.05%	13	0.41%	9	0.29%	3	0.10%	6	0.19%	3,153
Montezuma	4,745	75.34%	1,371	21.77%	71	1.13%	54	0.86%	28	0.44%	15	0.24%	14	0.22%	6,298
Montrose	7,665	72.63%	2,555	24.21%	148	1.40%	88	0.83%	62	0.59%	26	0.25%	10	0.09%	10,554
Morgan	4,530	81.40%	869	15.62%	90	1.62%	31	0.56%	22	0.40%	16	0.29%	7	0.13%	5,565
Otero	2,764	81.94%	518	15.36%	40	1.19%	23	0.68%	14	0.42%	10	0.30%	4	0.12%	3,373
Ouray	769	55.01%	590	42.20%	18	1.29%	8	0.57%	10	0.72%	1	0.07%	2	0.14%	1,398
Park	3,205	71.48%	1,154	25.74%	46	1.03%	30	0.67%	36	0.80%	12	0.27%	1	0.02%	4,484
Phillips	1,014	80.86%	199	15.87%	24	1.91%	5	0.40%	6	0.48%	5	0.40%	1	0.08%	1,254
Pitkin	708	38.25%	1,084	58.56%	21	1.13%	22	1.19%	11	0.59%	2	0.11%	3	0.16%	1,851
Prowers	2,104	85.95%	287	11.72%	30	1.23%	14	0.57%	8	0.33%	2	0.08%	3	0.12%	2,448
Pueblo	17,030	76.42%	4,700	21.09%	254	1.14%	145	0.65%	91	0.41%	38	0.17%	27	0.12%	22,285
Rio Blanco	1,592	80.69%	313	15.86%	36	1.82%	13	0.66%	13	0.66%	3	0.15%	3	0.15%	1,973
Rio Grande	1,783	75.94%	494	21.04%	37	1.58%	13	0.55%	11	0.47%	6	0.26%	4	0.17%	2,348
Routt	1,928	47.97%	1,959	48.74%	55	1.37%	33	0.82%	31	0.77%	4	0.10%	9	0.22%	4,019
Saguache	681	73.30%	209	22.50%	9	0.97%	10	1.08%	7	0.75%	11	1.18%	2	0.22%	929
San Juan	54	47.37%	58	50.88%	1	0.88%	0	0.00%	0	0.00%	0	0.00%	1	0.88%	114
San Miguel	393	42.67%	486	52.77%	7	0.76%	18	1.95%	9	0.98%	5	0.54%	3	0.33%	921
Sedgwick	559	81.84%	110	16.11%	5	0.73%	6	0.88%	1	0.15%	2	0.29%	0	0.00%	683
Summit	1,565	41.25%	2,106	55.51%	50	1.32%	37	0.98%	28	0.74%	6	0.16%	2	0.05%	3,794
Teller	5,486	75.60%	1,605	22.12%	95	1.31%	31	0.43%	29	0.40%	5	0.07%	6	0.08%	7,257
Washington	1,466	85.18%	212	12.32%	20	1.16%	8	0.46%	8	0.46%	7	0.41%	0	0.00%	1,721
Weld	40,067	73.19%	12,903	23.57%	867	1.58%	358	0.65%	318	0.58%	168	0.31%	64	0.12%	54,745
Yuma	2,073	83.15%	364	14.60%	27	1.08%	16	0.64%	5	0.20%	7	0.28%	1	0.04%	2,493
Total	549,468	63.37%	289,412	33.38%	12,577	1.45%	7,127	0.82%	5,046	0.58%	2,192	0.25%	1,263	0.15%	867,085

== See also ==
- 2024 Colorado Democratic presidential primary
- 2024 Republican Party presidential primaries
- 2024 United States presidential election
- 2024 United States presidential election in Colorado
- 2024 United States elections
