= Officer of the United States =

United States term of classification

An officer of the United States is a functionary of the executive or judicial branches of the federal government of the United States to whom is delegated some part of the country's sovereign power. The term officer of the United States is not a title, but a term of classification for a certain type of official.

Under the Appointments Clause of the Constitution, the principal officers of the U.S., such as federal judges, and ambassadors and "other public Ministers and Consuls", are appointed by the president with the advice and consent of the Senate, but Congress may vest the appointment of inferior officers to the president, courts, or federal department heads. Civilian officers of the U.S. are entitled to preface their names with the honorific style "the Honorable" for life, but this rarely occurs. Officers of the U.S. should not be confused with employees of the U.S.; the latter are more numerous and lack the special legal authority of the former.

== Origin and definition ==
The U.S. Supreme Court wrote in Nixon v. Fitzgerald, 457 U.S. 731 (1982): “Article II, § 1, of the Constitution provides that "[t]he executive Power shall be vested in a President of the United States..." This grant of authority establishes the President as the chief constitutional officer of the Executive Branch, entrusted with supervisory and policy responsibilities of utmost discretion and sensitivity. (457 U.S. 749-750).”

The Appointments Clause of the Constitution (Article II, section 2, clause 2), empowers the president of the United States to appoint "Officers of the United States" with the "advice and consent" of the U.S. Senate. The same clause also allows lower-level officials to be appointed without the advice and consent process.

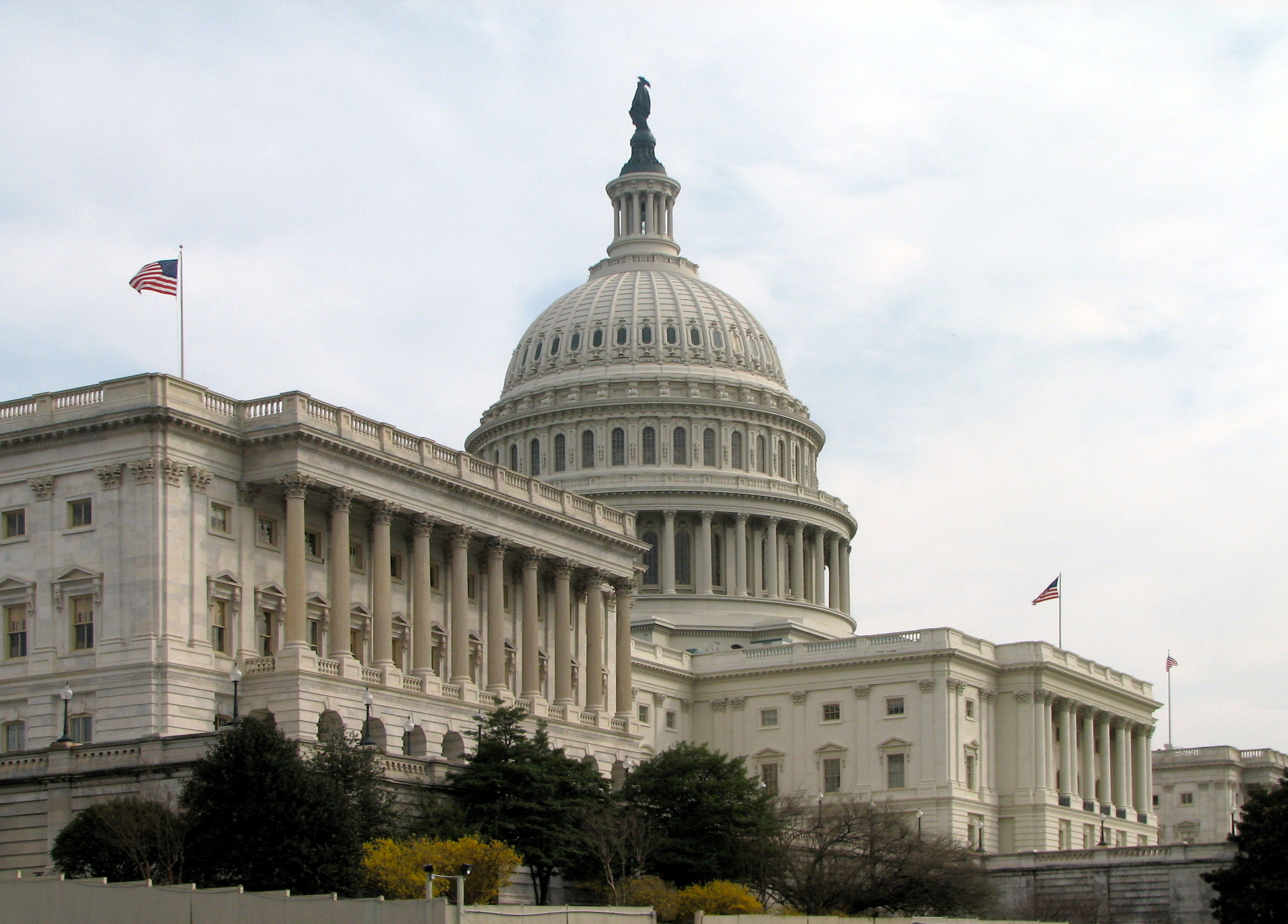
The Appointments Clause of the U.S. Constitution gives the U.S. Senate the right to confirm or reject the nomination of any officer of the United States.

... he shall nominate, and by and with the Advice and Consent of the Senate, shall appoint Ambassadors, other public Ministers and Consuls, Judges of the supreme Court, and all other Officers of the United States, whose Appointments are not herein otherwise provided for, and which shall be established by Law: but the Congress may by Law vest the Appointment of such inferior Officers as they think proper, in the President alone, in the Courts of Law, or in the Heads of Departments.

The Framers of the U.S. Constitution understood the role of high officers specially imbued with certain authority to act on behalf of the head of state within the context of their earlier experience with the British Crown. Day-to-day administration of the British Government was based on persons "holding sovereign authority delegated from the King that enabled them in conducting the affairs of government to affect the people." This was an extension of the general common-law rule that "where one man hath to do with another's affairs against his will, and without his leave, that this is an office, and he who is in it, is an officer."

In February 2020, The United States Court of Appeals for the District of Columbia Circuit in K&D LLC v. Trump Old Post Office, LLC, 951 F. 3d 503, concluded, at President Trump's request, that the U.S. president is a federal officer, when they wrote: “President Trump removed the suit to federal court under the federal officer removal statute, 28 U.S.C. § 1442(a)(1).”

According to an April 2007 memorandum opinion by the U.S. Department of Justice, Office of Legal Counsel, addressed to the general counsels of the executive branch, defined "officer of the United States" as:

a position to which is delegated by legal authority a portion of the sovereign power of the federal government and that is 'continuing' in a federal office subject to the Constitution's Appointment Clause. A person who would hold such a position must be properly made an 'officer of the United States' by being appointed pursuant to the procedures specified in the Appointments Clause.

Several officers of the U.S. are included in the presidential line of succession and are empowered to become acting president in situations where neither the president nor the vice president is able to discharge their functions. Article II, Section 1, Clause 6 of the Constitution authorizes Congress to enact such a statute.

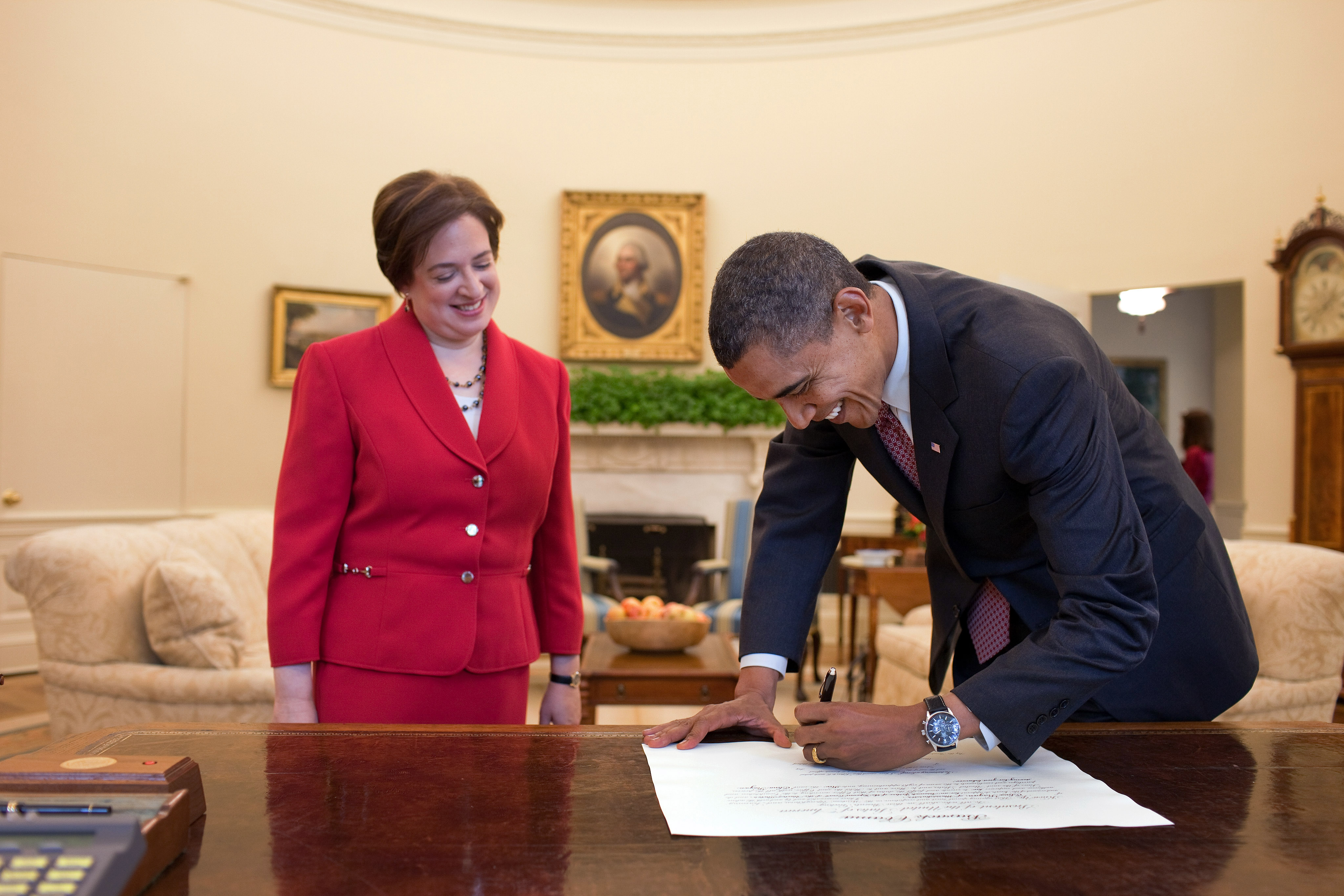
Barack Obama signs the commission document investing Elena Kagan as an officer of the United States in 2010, specifically as a justice of the U.S. Supreme Court.

The difference between an officer of the United States and an Employee of the United States, therefore, ultimately rests on whether the office held has been explicitly delegated part of the "sovereign power of the United States". Delegation of "sovereign power" means possession of the authority to commit the federal government of the U.S. to some legal obligation, such as by signing a contract, executing a treaty, interpreting a law, or issuing military orders. A federal judge, for instance, has been delegated part of the "sovereign power" of the U.S. to exercise; while a letter carrier for the U.S. Postal Service has not. Some very prominent title-holders, including the White House Chief of Staff, the White House Press Secretary and most other high-profile presidential staff assistants, are only employees of the U.S. as they have no authority to exercise the sovereign power of the federal government.

== Military officers and secondary appointments ==
In addition to civilian officers of the U.S., persons who hold military commissions are also considered officers of the U.S. While not explicitly defined as such in the Constitution, this fact is implicit in its structure. According to a 1996 opinion by then-Assistant Attorney General Walter Dellinger of the Justice Department's Office of Legal Counsel, "even the lowest ranking military or naval officer is a potential commander of U.S. armed forces in combat—and, indeed, is in theory a commander of large military or naval units by presidential direction or in the event of catastrophic casualties among his or her superiors." The officer's authority to command the armed forces of the United States draws its legitimacy from the president himself as "Commander in Chief of the Army and Navy of the United States"; the president cannot reasonably be expected to command every soldier, or any soldier, in the field and so delegates his authority to command to officers he commissions.

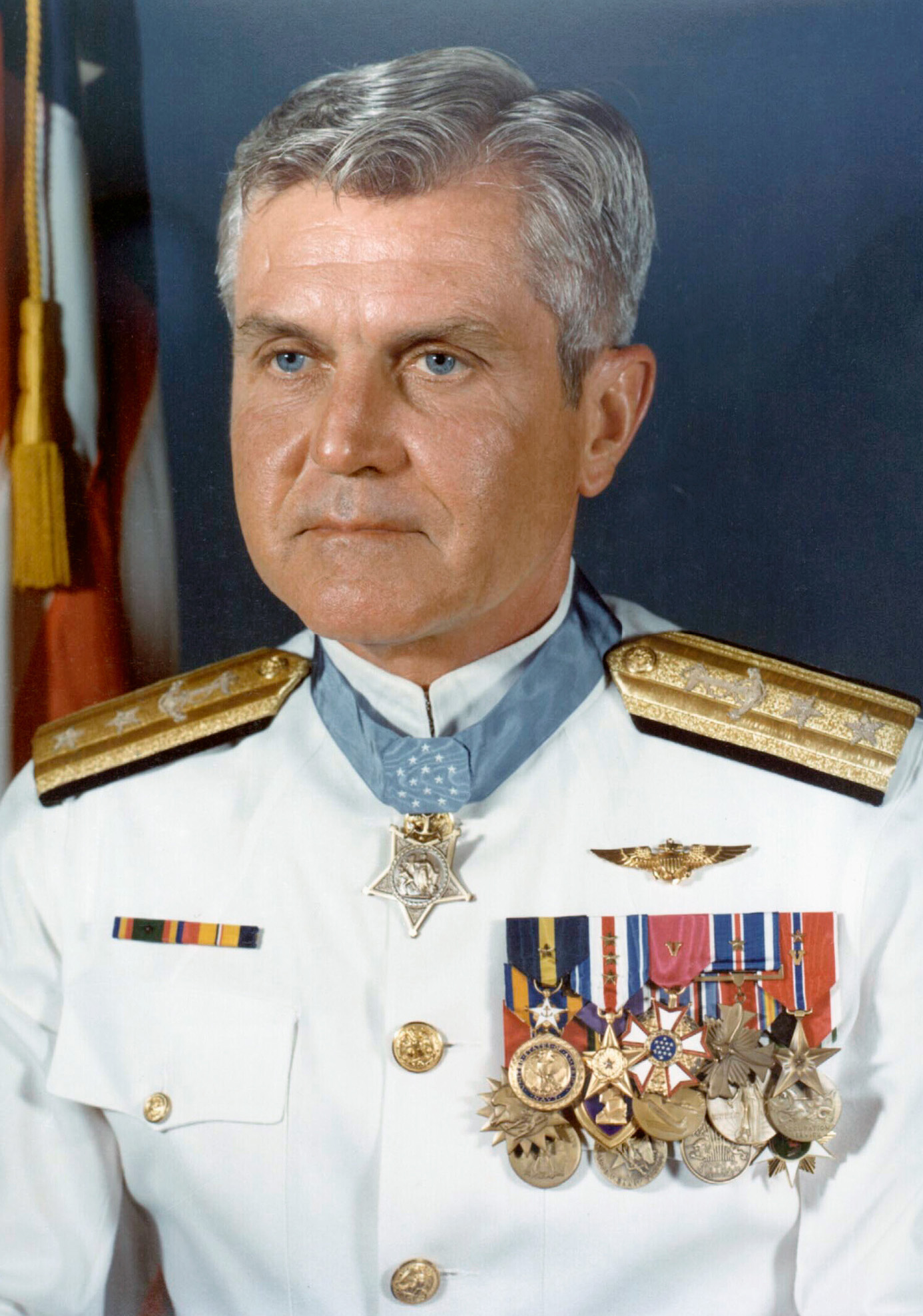
Military officers, such as Vice Admiral James Stockdale, are considered officers of the United States.

Commissioned officers of the eight uniformed services of the U.S.—the Army, Marine Corps, Navy, Air Force, Space Force, Coast Guard, National Oceanic and Atmospheric Administration (NOAA) Corps, and Public Health Service Commissioned Corps—are all officers of the U.S. Under current law. The Senate does not require the commissions of all military officers to be confirmed, but anyone being first promoted to Major in the Regular Army, Marine Corps, Air Force, or Space Force, or Lieutenant Commander in the Regular Navy, does require such confirmation. Additionally, military officers promoted in the Reserves to Colonel (or Captain in the Navy) also require Senate confirmation. This results in hundreds of promotions that annually must be confirmed by the Senate, though these are typically confirmed en masse without individual hearings.

Finally, some persons not appointed by the president but, instead, appointed by persons or bodies who are, themselves, appointed by the president may be officers of the United States if defined as such under the law. Examples include U.S. magistrate judges, who are appointed by U.S. district courts, and the U.S. postmaster general, who is appointed by the Board of Governors of the U.S. Postal Service, which, in turn, is appointed by the president.

== Ineligibility Clause ==
Members of the U.S. Congress—the legislative branch of the U.S. government—are not "officers of the United States" and cannot simultaneously serve in Congress and as an officer of the U.S. under the "Ineligibility Clause" (also called the "Incompatibility Clause") of the Constitution (Article 1, Section 6, Clause 2). This provision states:

No Senator or Representative shall, during the Time for which he was elected, be appointed to any civil Office under the Authority of the United States, which shall have been created, or the Emoluments whereof shall have been increased during such time; and no Person holding any Office under the United States, shall be a Member of either House during his Continuance in Office.

The question of whether the Ineligibility Clause bars member of Congress or civil officers of the U.S. from simultaneously serving in the military (especially the military reserves) has never been definitively resolved. A case involving the issue was litigated to the Supreme Court in Schlesinger v. Reservists Committee to Stop the War, but the Supreme Court decided the case on procedural grounds and did not address the Ineligibility Clause issue. Congress has enacted legislation provided that "a Reserve of the armed forces who is not on active duty or who is on active duty for training is deemed not an employee or an individual holding an office of trust or profit or discharging an official function under or in connection with the U.S. because of his appointment, oath, or status, or any duties or functions performed or pay or allowances received in that capacity." A 2009 Congressional Research Service report noted that "Because Congress has the power to determine the qualifications of its own Members, the limitations that it has imposed on what constitutes an employee holding an office of the United States may be significant to courts considering the constitutional limitations."

== Creation and appointment ==
With the exception of military officers and certain court- and board-appointed officers, the method for creating an officer of the U.S. generally follows a set procedure. First, the Constitution must describe the office, or the U.S. Congress must create the office through a statute (though the president may independently create offices when exercising his exclusive jurisdiction in the exercise of foreign affairs, generally meaning ambassadorships). Second, the president nominates a person to fill the office and then commissions that person at which time the appointee comes to occupy the office and is an officer of the U.S. However, if the office is that of ambassador, "public minister" (member of the Cabinet of the U.S.), judge of the U.S. Supreme Court, or if the office has not been specifically vested for filling "in the President alone" by the authorizing legislation, then an intermediate step is required before the commission can be issued, namely, the U.S. Senate must give its "advise and consent" which, in practice, means approval by vote of a simple majority.

An officer of the U.S. assumes his office's full authority upon the issuance of the commission. However, officers must take an oath of office before they can be paid.

== Statistics ==
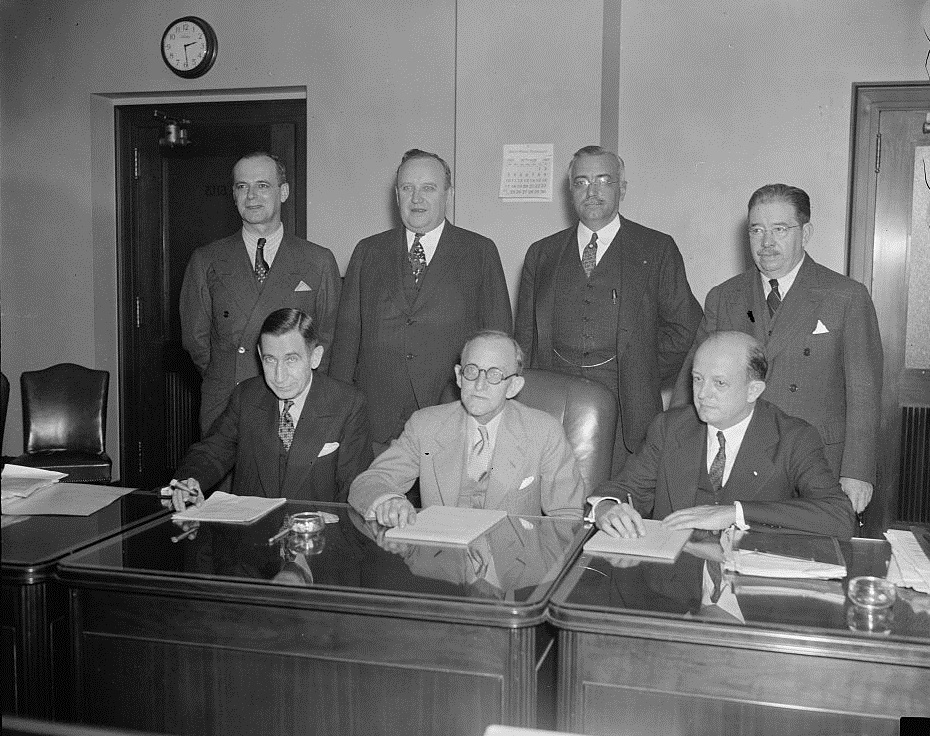
The Federal Communications Commission pictured in 1937. Each of the commissioners is an officer of the United States by virtue of their authority to discharge part of the sovereign power of the U.S., specifically, regulation of radio waves.

According to a 2012 study by the Congressional Research Service, there are between 1,200 and 1,400 civilian officers of the U.S. which are subject to the "advice and consent" of the Senate prior to commissioning. A further 100,000 civilian officers of the U.S. have been exempted from this requirement by the U.S. Congress under the "inferior officer" exemption allowed by the Appointments Clause.

Among military officers there were, as of 2012, 127,966 officers in the Selected Reserve and 365,483 officers in the U.S. Armed Forces. The NOAA Corps and U.S. Public Health Service had smaller numbers of officers.

== Examples ==
Officers of the U.S. in the executive branch are numerous, but some examples include the secretary of defense, the attorney general, the administrator of the Environmental Protection Agency, the director of national intelligence, the director of the Federal Bureau of Investigation, the administrator of the National Aeronautics and Space Administration, and members of the Federal Communications Commission and Interstate Commerce Commission.

== Regarding the president of the United States ==
In December 2023, the Colorado Supreme Court ruled that the U.S. president is an officer of the United States as pertains to Section 3 of the 14th Amendment of the United States Constitution, reversing a November 2023 contrary ruling by a Colorado district court. Section 3 regards the disqualification from public office of any officers of the United States who have engaged in insurrection or rebellion against the United States. It was used by the Colorado Supreme Court in Anderson v. Griswold, to disqualify Donald Trump from the ballot for the 2024 Colorado Republican primary, pending an appeal to the US Supreme Court.

This has raised the question of whether the president is an officer of the United States. There are two approaches to an answer: Textualists interpret the meaning of the text, and originalists interpret the public opinion at the time the text was written. On the one hand, textual interpretations exist that exclude the presidency from the group of officers. On the other hand, it is clear that during the 19th century, the president of the United States was considered an officer of the United States by the public because the original public meaning of “officer” is much broader than modern doctrine assumes— encompassing any government official with responsibility for an ongoing governmental duty. In the case of K&D LLC v. Trump Old Post Office, LLC, 951 F. 3d 503, President Trump successfully argued that the U.S. president qualifies as an officer of the United States, citing 28 U.S.C. § 1442(a)(1). The court agreed, stating this statute permitted President Trump, in his capacity as an "officer... of the United States", to remove the state suit relating to duties of his office to federal court.

However, the ruling from the Colorado district court involved distinguishing the oath referred to in Section 3 of the 14th Amendment (an oath to "support" the constitution) from the presidential oath (to "preserve, protect, and defend" the constitution). The December 2023 Colorado Supreme Court ruling rejected this argument in a section titled "The Presidential Oath Is an Oath to Support the Constitution".

The ruling from the Colorado district court also involved giving benefit of the doubt to the presidential candidate. The Colorado Supreme Court ruling dismissed the resulting interpretation of Section 3 as being contrary to its "plain language and history".

One point of contention in the wider context of the U.S. Constitution is whether classifying the president as an officer of the United States conflicts with the Appointments Clause (Article II, Section 2, Clause 2, which in part concerns appointment by the president of Officers of the United States). Citing a report by the Supreme Court of the United States in the 2010 case of Free Enterprise Fund v. Public Company Accounting Oversight Board stating that "The people do not vote for the 'Officers of the United States'", Josh Blackman, a constitutional law professor and adjunct scholar at the Cato Institute, and Seth Barrett Tillman, member of the Faculty of Law at Maynooth University, have argued that the president is not constitutionally an "officer of the United States". Ilya Somin, chair of Constitutional Studies at the Cato Institute, has disagreed, noting that the Appointments Clause refers to "Officers of the United States, whose Appointments are not herein [in the constitution] otherwise provided for", and propounding that the president could have been considered to be appointed via vote of the electoral college, as evidenced by an essay in The Federalist Papers.

The President of the United States would be an officer elected by the people for FOUR years; the king of Great Britain is a perpetual and HEREDITARY prince.

— The Federalist Papers : No. 69

Blackman and Tillman construe “whose Appointments are not herein otherwise provided for” as a descriptive clause that can be removed from the sentence to leave the sentence still discussing all Officers of the United States, rather than as a restrictive clause compatible with existence of Officers of the United States that are out of scope of the sentence, but have appointment "herein [in the constitution] provided for".

A select committee report to the 39th Congress identified the “officers of the United States” with “appointment herein provided for” as “the President, Vice President, and members of Congress”, despite having considered at least part of the Incompatibility Clause. Similarly, an essay in The Federalist Papers spells out that Senators are not covered by the first part of the Appointments Clause since they are "otherwise provided for" in the Constitution, and established by it, rather than "by law". And Blackman and Tillman admit to having been advised by Justice Scalia, "The manner in which the President and Vice President hold their offices is 'provide[d] otherwise' by the Constitution" in explication of the following opinion of his: "Except where the Constitution or a valid federal law provides otherwise, all 'Officers of the United States' must be appointed by the President 'by and with the Advice and Consent of the Senate.'"

== Customs and courtesies ==
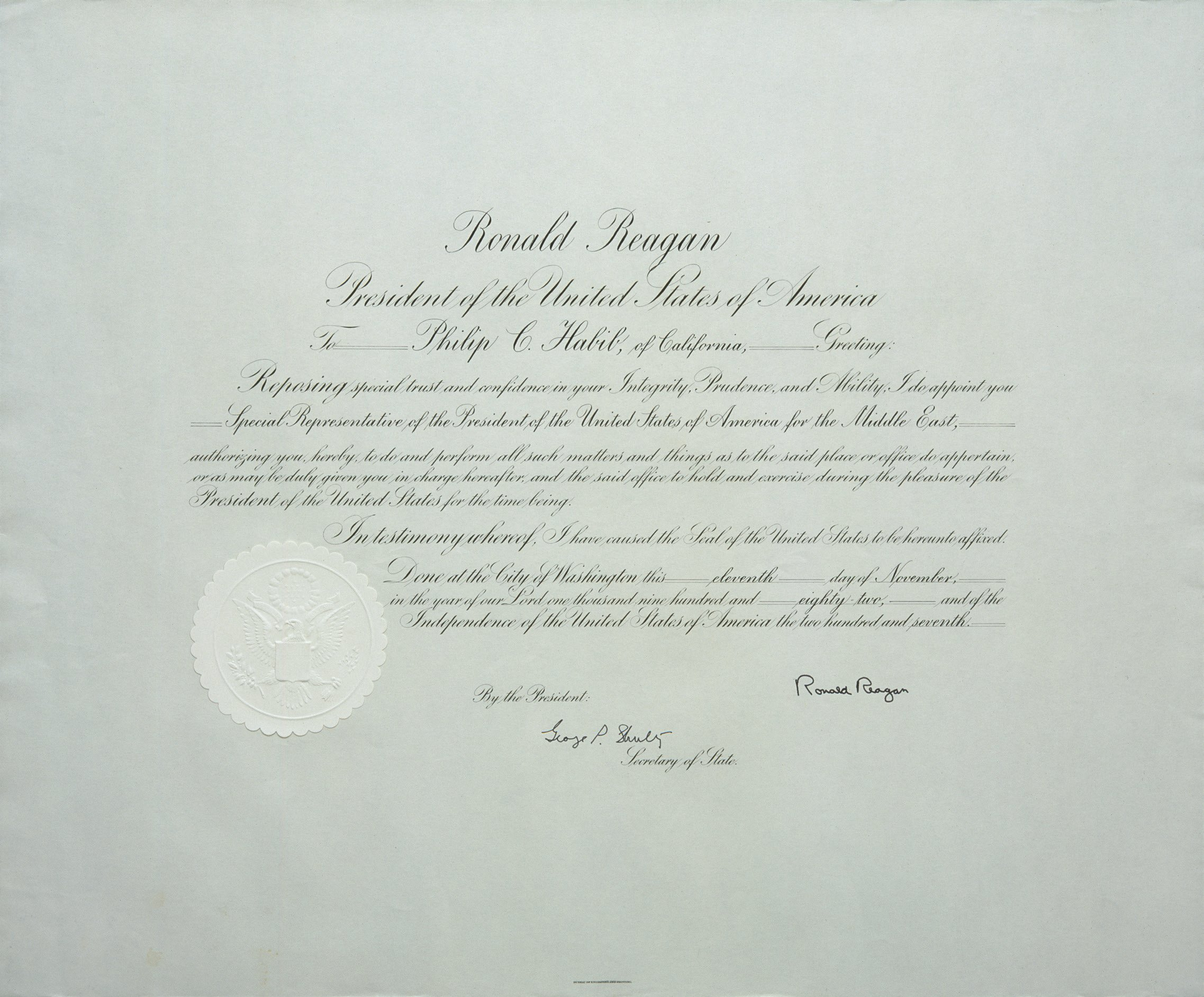
Commission for Philip Habib for his trip as Special Representative of the President of the United States for the Middle East in 1982, signed by President Ronald Reagan and Secretary of State George P. Shultz

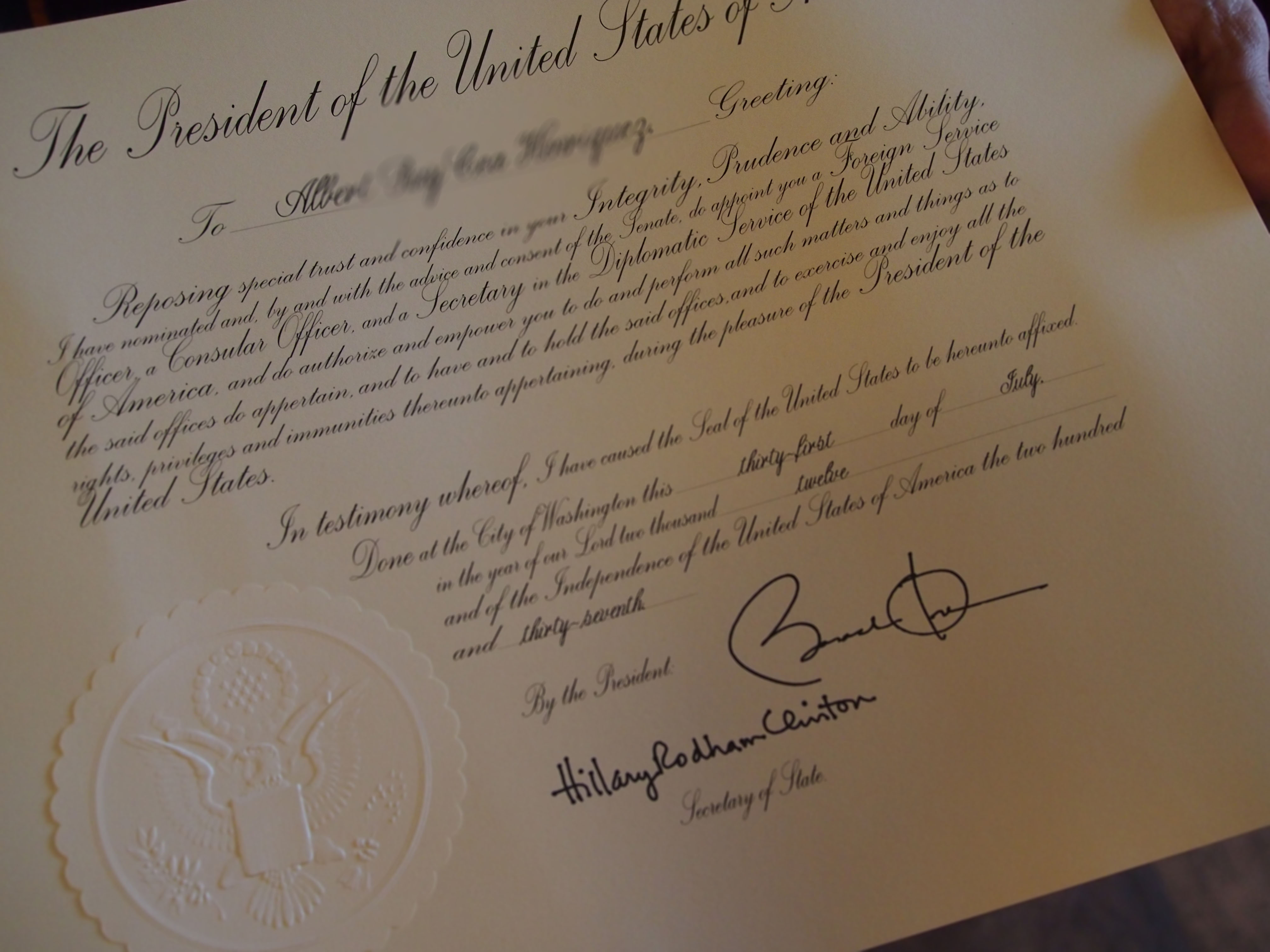
The commission issued to a U.S. vice consul in 2012

=== Commission certificate ===
Most civilian officers of the U.S. are issued written commissions. Those who do not require confirmation of the Senate are provided semi-engraved commission certificates (partially printed with hand inscription of name, date, and title by a White House calligrapher) on letter-sized parchment. To this is set the signatures of the president and the U.S. Secretary of State applied by autopen. The document is sealed with the Great Seal of the U.S. Those who require confirmation of the Senate are issued fully engraved certificates (certificates completely hand-written by a calligrapher) on foolscap folio sized parchment. The president and secretary of state usually hand-sign these certificates and, like others, they are sealed with the Great Seal.

The commissions of military officers are signed under the line "for the President" by the appropriate service secretary (e.g. the secretary of the Army, secretary of the Navy, secretary of the Air Force, or for the Coast Guard, the secretary of homeland security), instead of the secretary of state, and are sealed with their respective departmental seal (e.g. Army seal) instead of the Great Seal.

The presentation of commissions for civilian officers generally follows the following style, or some variation thereof:

To all who shall see these presents, greeting: Know Ye that, reposing special trust in the integrity, ability, and fidelity of John Dow, I have nominated and, by and with the advice and consent of the Senate, do appoint John Dow as Librarian of Congress, and do authorize and empower him to execute and fulfill the duties of that office according to law, and to have and to hold said office, with all the powers, privileges, and emoluments to the same of right appertaining unto him, the said Librarian of Congress, for the term of ten years, unless the President of the United States, for the time being, should be pleased sooner to revoke this commission. In testimony whereof, I have caused these letters to be made patent and the seal of the United States hereunto affixed.
Given under my hand, at the city of Washington, the twenty-ninth day of April, in the year of our Lord two thousand and sixteen, and of the independence of the United States of America the two-hundred and fortieth. BY THE PRESIDENT.

== Honorific title ==
Civilian officers of the U.S. are permitted to be titled "the Honorable" for life, even after they cease being an officer of the U.S. In practice, however, this custom is rarely observed except in the case of judges. When it is invoked for non-judicial officers it is only done in written address or platform introductions and never by the official to whom it is applied in reference to him or herself.

== See also ==
- Executive Schedule
- Officer of the court
