= Kiki Traylor =

American state legislator

Kathleen "Kiki" Traylor is a former state legislator in Colorado. She was appointed to a seat in the house Colorado Senate, and works for biotech company Amgen in its government affairs division.

She grew up in Denver. She graduated with a B.A. in Human Biology from Stanford University and received and M.D. from University of Colorado School of Medicine with honors. Hse has lived in Littleton, Colorado. She is married to Frank Traylor and they have a son and daughter. She was appointed to the Colorado Senate to succeed Norma Anderson who left office with a year remaining in her term.

She campaigned to retain her seat, but lost in the 2006 Republican Primary to Mike Kopp who went on to win election to the office.
