= Mike Kopp =

American politician

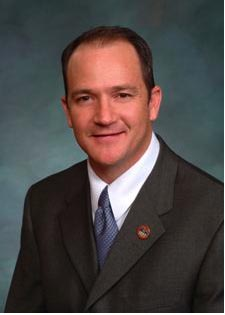

Member of the Colorado Senate from the 22nd district
- In office January 4, 2007 – October 21, 2011
- Preceded by: Kiki Traylor
- Succeeded by: Tim Neville

Personal details
- Born: 1968 (age 57–58) Rapid City, South Dakota, U.S.
- Party: Republican
- Spouse(s): Shannon Kopp (2013-present); Kimberly Kopp (1994-2011)
- Education: North Central University; University of Colorado, Boulder

Mike Kopp (born c. 1968) is an American politician and member of the Republican Party who served as a member of the Colorado Senate, representing Senate District 22, which encompassed southern Jefferson County. He served from 2007 and as Senate Minority Leader from 2009 until his resignation in October 2011 after his wife died from cancer. He was a candidate for the Republican nomination for Governor of Colorado in 2014.

== Biography ==
Born in South Dakota (his father was elected to the South Dakota House of Representatives in 2008), Kopp enlisted in the United States Army after graduating from high school. A paratrooper with the 82nd Airborne Division, Kopp trained to become a member of the United States Army Rangers, graduating from Ranger School in 1990. Kopp also completed the Army Basic Leadership Course that same year. While in the Army, Kopp was deployed to Honduras in support of Operation Just Cause, as well as in the Gulf War in Operation Desert Storm. He was honorably discharged in 1991 at the rank of Sergeant, having also received two Army Commendation Medals, the Combat Infantryman Badge and the Army Achievement Medal.

While pursuing higher education, Kopp worked with fire-fighting crews for the National Park Service. He graduated in 1995 with a bachelor's degree in ministry from North Central University in Minneapolis. He also worked for two years as a clerk in the United States Border Patrol's Detention and Deportation Division.

Following graduation, Kopp worked in the non-profit and ministry fields in New Mexico, Arizona, and Colorado. Prior to running for the Colorado senate, Kopp earned a Masters of Public Administration degree from the University of Colorado at Denver. He was Manager of Corporate Affairs for Intermountain Rural Electric Association.

Mike Kopp served as the President and CEO of Colorado Concern, an alliance of top business executives with a mission of enhancing the Centennial State's business climate until 2024. In 2025 he was appointed to serve as a Senior Advisor at the Department of Energy under Secretary Chris Wright.

== Legislative career ==
=== 2006 election ===
In 2006, Kopp sought election to the state senate seat formerly held by term-limited Sen. Norma Anderson. Anderson retired from her senate seat a year early, and Kiki Traylor had been appointed to the seat. Kopp had sought the vacancy appointment, protesting that the vacancy committee met with insufficient notice and was composed of only five committee members. Kopp faced Traylor and Justin Everett in a three-way Republican contest, and won 52 percent of the vote at the Republican party assembly to qualify for the primary; Traylor and Everett petitioned onto the primary ballot.

Kopp ran as a more conservative candidate than Traylor, criticizing her positions on spending and immigration. During the race, a supporter of the Kopp campaign filed, and later withdrew, a campaign finance complaint against Traylor regarding a donation from a teachers' union that Traylor refused to accept. Kopp received endorsements from former U.S. Senator Bill Armstrong and former Colorado Senate President John Andrews. Kopp achieved a narrow victory, taking 45 percent of the vote over Traylor's 44 percent, with and Everett receiving 8 percent. Citing tactics used by Kopp and his supporters, Traylor refused to endorse fellow Republican Kopp in the general election, even after a request from Republican gubernatorial candidate Bob Beauprez.

Despite the district's strong Republican registration advantage, Kopp's right-leaning views and division among Republicans made the seat an attractive target for Colorado Democrats; he faced Democrat Paul Noonan, a business consultant, in the general election. Kopp won the senate seat with 53 percent of the popular vote.

Incumbent Sen. Traylor resigned slightly before the end of her term, in late December 2006. Kopp was appointed by a Republican Party vacancy committee to fill the remainder of Traylor's term, and was sworn in as a state senator on January 4, 2007, a few days ahead of when he would have otherwise taken office.

=== 2007 legislative session ===
In the 2007 session of the General Assembly, Kopp served on the Senate Appropriations Committee, the Senate Education Committee, and the Senate Finance Committee.

During the session, Kopp, the only Gulf War veteran in the Colorado legislature, introduced legislation to create a memorial for Colorado soldiers killed in Iraq and Afghanistan near the state capitol. Kopp also lead opposition to a Democratic resolution opposing the 2007 Iraq troop surge, introducing a competing resolution and leading a rally in support of the surge in Iraq at the state capitol.

Following the 2007 session, Kopp served on a school reform task force convened by Colorado Gov. Bill Ritter, and on the interim legislative Health Care Task Force.

In November 2007, Senate Republicans elected Kopp minority caucus chair, following the resignation of Sen. Ron May.

=== 2008 legislative session ===
In the 2008 session of the General Assembly, Kopp serves on the Senate Appropriations Committee, the Senate Education Committee, and the Senate Finance Committee.

During the 2008 session, Kopp plans to sponsor bills to create a sales tax holiday for school supplies, to require students to pass standardized tests as a requirement for graduating from high school, to provide income tax credits for volunteer firefighters, and to create wildfire training programs for fire district boards. He was also the Senate sponsor of a measure to create an interim committee to study wildfire risks in the wildland–urban interface, calling it the "most pressing public-safety issue before the state."

After the 2008 session, Kopp proposed an "omnibus bill" with incentives for volunteer fire departments to retain personnel, and legislation to set "bookends" on the starting and ending dates for school years. Responding to a deal between labor and business leaders to remove several statewide referendums from the 2008 general election ballot, Kopp and Rep. Amy Stephens announced plans to introduce legislation that would prohibit financial deals for the removal of initiatives from Colorado election ballots.

=== 2009 legislative session ===
For the 2009 legislative session, Kopp sponsored legislation to repeal the state tax on insurance premiums paid by employers to cover on-the-job injuries, legislation to require a special election to fill vacancies in the U.S. Senate, and legislation to require that the state of Colorado purchase vehicles fueled by natural gas to save money. On January 25, 2010, the Senator was awarded the 2009 Legislator of the Year award from the Colorado Youth Corps Association because of his work on forest health and job creation issues.

=== 2010 legislative session ===
For the 2010 legislative session, Senator Kopp sponsored the "Blue Print for a Leaner Government Act." This bill was designed to make the Colorado government more efficient through the use of two task forces. These bipartisan task forces were intended to investigate the executive branch department and agencies as well as the current regulatory system. After a period of analysis, the task forces would then present their findings, recommendations, and estimated cost savings in an attempt to provide a leaner and more effective government.
