= Rob Woodward (politician) =

American politician

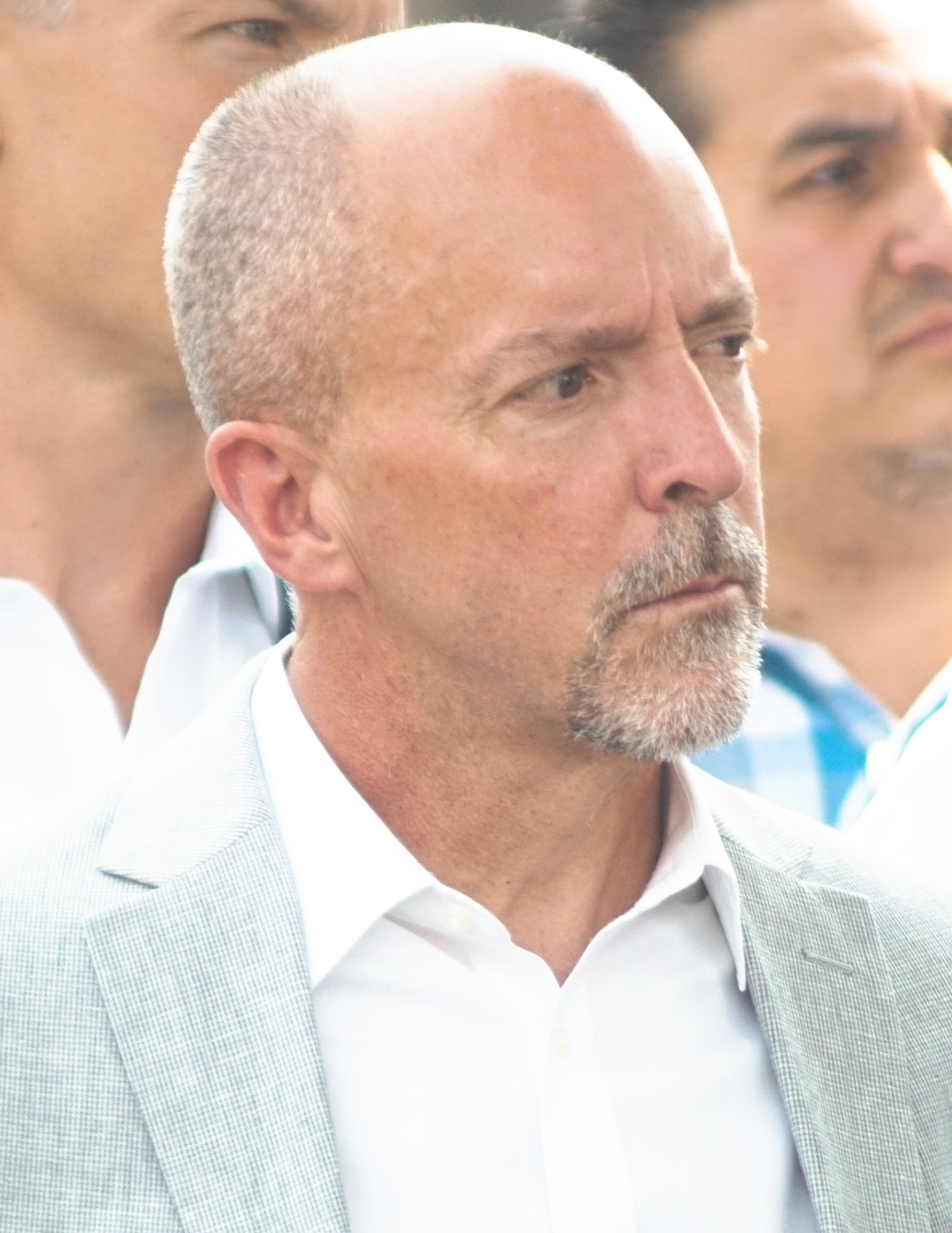

Member of the Colorado Senate from the 15th district
- In office January 4, 2019 – January 9, 2023
- Preceded by: Kevin Lundberg
- Succeeded by: Janice Marchman

Personal details
- Born: 1968 or 1969 (age 56–57)
- Party: Republican
- Spouse: Paula
- Education: Colorado State University

Rob Woodward is an American restaurateur and politician and a former state senator in the U.S. state of Colorado. In the senate he served on the Senate Statutory Revision Committee, the Legislative Audit Committee, and the Business, Labor, and Technology Committee. Woodward was elected to the Colorado Senate as a Republican in November 2018. He represented Senate District 15 which encompassed most of Larimer County outside of Fort Collins.

== Biography ==
He was born in Wyoming, where his great-grandfather settled in 1906. He has been a Colorado resident since the 1990s and obtained his Bachelor of Science in Finance from Colorado State University and an MBA with concentration in finance from DePaul University.

Woodward and his wife, Paula, have been married since 1991, and have three children: Andrew, Allie and Kate.

Woodward owns 28 Subway franchises in Northern Colorado, Wyoming and Nebraska, and manages over 450 employees. He opened his first store at the age of 21.

== Elections ==
=== 2018 election ===
Before Senator Kevin Lundberg’s departure from the State Senate due to term limits, Rob Woodward declared his candidacy as a Republican, citing a "general lack of progress and lack of non-Denver sway as a reason for jumping in."

Woodward’s individual endorsements included United States Representative Ken Buck, State Senator Kevin Lundberg, State Senator Jerry Sonnenberg, State Senator John Cooke, State Representative Perry Buck, former United States Representative Bob Schaffer, State Representative Hugh McKean, Larimer County Sheriff Justin Smith, Estes Park Town Board Member Cody Rex Walker, former State Representative Brian DelGrosso and former Loveland City Councilman Troy Kenning.

He defeated Democrat Rebecca Cranston 53%-47%.

In the 2022 Colorado Senate election, Woodward lost to Democrat Janice Marchman.
