= Trump v. Anderson =

United States Supreme Court case

- Supreme Court of the United States

Argued February 8, 2024 Decided March 4, 2024
- Full case name: Donald J. Trump v. Norma Anderson, Michelle Priola, Claudine Cmarada, Krista Kafer, Kathi Wright, and Christopher Castilian
- Docket no.: 23-719
- Citations: 601 U.S. 100 (more)
- Argument: Oral argument
- Decision: Opinion

Case history
- Prior: Aff'd in part and rev'd in part, Anderson v. Griswold, 543 P.3d 283 (Colo. 2023).; Cert. granted (Jan. 5, 2024).

Holding
- Only Congress, not the states, can determine eligibility for federal office under Section 3 of the Fourteenth Amendment. Colorado Supreme Court reversed.

Court membership
- Chief Justice John Roberts Associate Justices Clarence Thomas · Samuel Alito; Sonia Sotomayor · Elena Kagan; Neil Gorsuch · Brett Kavanaugh; Amy Coney Barrett · Ketanji Brown Jackson

Case opinions
- Per curiam
- Concurrence: Barrett (in part and in judgment)
- Concurrence: Sotomayor, Kagan, Jackson (in judgment)

Laws applied
- U.S. Const. amend. XIV, §§ 3, 5

Trump v. Anderson, 601 U.S. 100 (2024), is a U.S. Supreme Court case in which the Court unanimously held that states could not determine eligibility for federal office, including the presidency, under Section 3 of the Fourteenth Amendment. In December 2023, the Colorado Supreme Court had rejected Donald Trump's presidential eligibility on the basis of his actions during the January 6 Capitol attack, adhering to the Fourteenth Amendment disqualification theory. The case was known as Anderson v. Griswold in the Colorado state courts.

The Colorado Supreme Court held that Trump's actions before and during the attack constituted engagement in insurrection; their assertion is that Section 3 of the Fourteenth Amendment disqualifies presidential candidates who have engaged in insurrection against the United States. The Colorado Supreme Court's ruling in Anderson v. Griswold was the first time that a presidential candidate was disqualified from office in a state on the basis of the Fourteenth Amendment. The court stayed its decision until a ruling of the U.S. Supreme Court.

On January 5, 2024, the U.S. Supreme Court granted Trump's petition for a writ of certiorari seeking review of the Colorado Supreme Court ruling in Anderson v. Griswold on an accelerated pace; oral arguments were held on February 8, 2024. On March 4, 2024, the Supreme Court issued a per curiam ruling reversing the Colorado Supreme Court decision. All nine justices held that an individual state cannot determine eligibility under Section 3 for federal office holders, and that such power is conferred exclusively to the federal government. A majority of the court also ruled the section to be non-justiciable, and that only Congress can enforce Section 3, i.e. the courts (federal or otherwise) cannot declare a candidate ineligible for office under Section 3 unless an Act of Congress explicitly grants them that power. Four justices disagreed with the latter ruling, and expressed concern in concurrences that this decision went further than needed.

== Background ==
=== January 6 Capitol attack ===
On December 19, 2020, six weeks following his election loss, Trump urged his followers on Twitter to protest in Washington, D.C., on January 6, the day Congress was set to certify the results of the election, writing, "Be there, will be wild!" Over the course of the following weeks, Trump would repeat the January 6 date. Militant organizations and groups affiliated with the conspiracy theory QAnon formulated logistical plans to gather at the United States Capitol. In the lead up to January 6, Trump continued to repeat false claims about election results of various states including Georgia, Pennsylvania, Michigan, Nevada, and Arizona. On the morning of January 6, Trump gave a speech in the Ellipse, a park near the White House, and encouraged his followers to walk down to Pennsylvania Avenue to incite within Republicans the "kind of pride and boldness that they need to take back our country". Provoked by Trump, the mob of Trump supporters stormed the Capitol.

=== Fourteenth Amendment disqualification theory ===
Section 3. No person shall ... hold any office, civil or military, under the United States ... who, having previously taken an oath ... as an officer of the United States ... to support the Constitution of the United States, shall have engaged in insurrection or rebellion against the same, or given aid or comfort to the enemies thereof. But Congress may, by a vote of two-thirds of each House, remove such disability.

In August 2023, conservative legal scholars and Federalist Society members William Baude and Michael Stokes Paulsen, in an article to be published in the University of Pennsylvania Law Review, posited that Trump is ineligible to be president. Baude and Paulsen argue that Section Three of the Fourteenth Amendment—a section that prevents individuals from holding office who, having "previously taken an oath ... to support the Constitution of the United States", have "engaged in insurrection or rebellion" against the United States—applies to Trump through his fraudulent electors plot and "specific encouragement" of January 6, including refusing to call in the National Guard, evidenced by the House Select Committee on the January 6 Attack and his second federal indictment. According to Baude and Paulsen, states are given legal obligation and precedent to remove Trump from primary ballots under Article Two of the Constitution, which establishes presidential eligibility requirements. Baude and Paulsen concede, however, that the decision in Griffin's Case (1869) adopted a pragmatic, consequentialist interpretation of Section Three, contrary to their position. In an article to be published in the Texas Review of Law and Politics, law professors Josh Blackman and Seth Barrett Tillman responded to Baude and Paulsen, arguing against the basis for a Fourteenth Amendment disqualification of Trump. Experts who spoke with the The Washington Post and op-eds published by The Washington Post, Bloomberg Opinion and The New York Times.

In March 2022, a district judge ruled that then-representative Madison Cawthorn, who had participated in the January 6 attack on the Capitol, could not be barred from the ballot as an insurrectionist due to the Amnesty Act of 1872. In May 2022, by which time Cawthorn had lost in the primary election, the ruling that the Amnesty Act applies was reversed on appeal. In September 2022, Couy Griffin, who held a state, not a federal, office as an Otero County, New Mexico commissioner, was barred from holding public office for life, his participation as the leader of the Cowboys for Trump group during the attack on the Capitol having been found to be an act of insurrection under Section 3.

== Lower court history ==
=== District Court ===
On September 6, 2023, six voters filed a lawsuit in Colorado state district court invoking the Fourteenth Amendment disqualification theory. The petitioners included four Republican voters (including former state Senate Majority Leader Norma Anderson, the titular plaintiff, and former U.S. Representative Claudine Schneider) and two unaffiliated voters. The lawsuit asks for the court to prevent Trump from appearing on the state's Republican presidential primary. Jena Griswold is named as the respondent in her official capacity as Colorado Secretary of State, while Trump and the Colorado Republican State Central Committee are named as intervenors. The trial began on October 30 with Judge Sarah B. Wallace presiding. Wallace refused a request from Trump's lawyers to dismiss the case.

The court heard from several eyewitnesses, including two police officers and a member of Congress; the case for Trump being disqualified also made use of some findings from the United States House Select Committee on the January 6 Attack. Testimony in support of that case was also taken from an expert on far-right extremism and an expert on national security, a constitutional law professor, and an elections administrator.

On November 17, Wallace ruled that Griswold must keep Trump on the ballot but stated that Trump engaged in insurrection by standard of preponderance of the evidence, the first time a judge has explicitly stated Trump incited the January 6 Capitol attack, with regard to his prior rhetoric and inaction during the attack. Wallace stated that Trump was not an officer of the United States with sparse "direct evidence" suggesting the presidency is included as part of the functionary.

The Colorado district court applied a definition whereby, in the context of section 3 of the Fourteenth Amendment, an insurrection is "a public use of force or threat of force ... by a group of people ... to hinder or prevent execution of the Constitution of the United States".

=== Colorado Supreme Court ===
The plaintiffs appealed on November 20. The Colorado Supreme Court agreed to take up Anderson v. Griswold on November 21. On December 19, the court ruled in a 4–3 per curiam decision that Trump is disqualified from the primary ballot, reversing the district court's ruling. In its decision, the Colorado Supreme Court noted that not all other states have standards to pre-qualify candidates for primary elections, citing the primary election framework in Michigan; election law in Michigan does not include the term "qualified candidate", Michigan courts cannot explicitly assess the qualifications of a candidate, and the Michigan secretary of state's responsibilities are limited in primary elections. Colorado's election code, by contrast, provides the state with greater dominion over the removal of a candidate.

Trump was found to have not merely incited an insurrection, but to have participated in one. The Colorado Supreme Court found it unnecessary to define insurrection, instead holding that "it suffices for us to conclude that any definition of 'insurrection' for purposes of Section Three would encompass a concerted and public use of force or threat of force by a group of people to hinder or prevent the U.S. government from taking the actions necessary to accomplish a peaceful transfer of power in this country."

Chief Justice Brian Boatright and Associate Justices Carlos Samour and Maria Berkenkotter offered dissenting opinions. Chief Justice Boatright dissented based on the contention that the question of whether a candidate had participated in an insurrection was too broad to be adjudicated under the relevant jurisdictional statute. Justice Samour doubted that the abbreviated trial proceeding on eligibility could have provided adequate due process. He contrasted the amount of due process received by Trump to that which would have been mandatory in a criminal trial for insurrection. Both Justice Samour and Justice Berkenkotter denied that there was a state law cause of action for enforcing Section Three.

The court's ruling was initially stayed until January 4, 2024, the day before Colorado's deadline to print primary ballots, though it was indefinitely extended.

Within 24 hours of the ruling, numerous threats of violence and death were made on social media towards the members of the Colorado Supreme Court on the majority opinion. The FBI stated they would investigate these threats alongside state and local police.

=== Reactions to ruling ===
==== Republican response ====
Republicans across the country condemned the ruling.

Trump campaign spokesperson Steven Cheung stated that the Colorado Supreme Court's ruling eliminated the "rights of Colorado voters to vote for the candidate of their choice". The Trump campaign used the ruling to fundraise, accusing Democrats of attempting to "amass total control over America by rigging the election". Trump did not mention the ruling during a speech hours later in Waterloo, Iowa. He has denied being an insurrectionist.

Other Republican presidential candidates denounced the ruling. Vivek Ramaswamy called the decision an "attack on democracy" in a statement on social media. Florida Governor Ron Desantis claimed “The Left invokes ‘democracy’ to justify its use of power, even if it means abusing judicial power to remove a candidate from the ballot based on spurious legal grounds.” Nikki Haley told reporters that she does not believe Donald J. Trump should be president but criticized the ruling, stating that she plans "to beat him fair and square," and that the voters should make that decision. Chris Christie, an ardent critic of Trump, nevertheless opposed the ruling, stating that Trump should be "prevented from being president of the United States by the voters," not the courts. Candidate Asa Hutchinson stated that the ruling would "haunt his candidacy"; Hutchinson had drawn attention to the Fourteenth Amendment disqualification theory during the first Republican debate.

Senator JD Vance (R-OH) accused the court of "using legal process as political weapon to take away the rights of millions of American voters." Speaker of the House Mike Johnson described the decision as a "thinly veiled partisan attack". Senator Thom Tillis (R-NC) said he intends to introduce legislation withholding election administration federal funds to states implementing the Fourteenth Amendment disqualification theory. Colorado U.S. Representative Lauren Boebert wrote that the decision was "designed to suppress the vote and voices of hundreds of thousands of Coloradans".

Vivek Ramaswamy vowed to withdraw from the Colorado primary ballot in protest. The Colorado Republican Party tweeted that it would "withdraw" from the primary and instead use a pure caucus system if the ruling stands.

==== Democratic response ====
President Joe Biden said, in response to the Colorado Supreme Court's ruling, that there was "no question" that Trump had supported an insurrection.

Colorado Representative Jason Crow lauded the Colorado Supreme Court's ruling.

Delaware Senator Chris Coons hailed the Colorado Supreme Court's ruling barring former President Donald Trump from the state's ballot, calling it "a plain reading of the text of the 14th amendment".

Some Democrats opposed the ruling.

Pennsylvania Senator John Fetterman criticized the efforts to keep Trump off the ballot as "incredibly unhelpful", stating that any effort to keep Trump off the ballot "just make[s] him more popular and strong. That's just going to energize his base. It's just not helpful." Fetterman closed the statement by saying that Democrats should instead focus on defeating Trump in the polls.

California Governor Gavin Newsom also criticized the ruling in Colorado, stating that "There is no doubt that Donald Trump is a threat to our liberties and even to our democracy. But in California, we defeat candidates at the polls. Everything else is a political distraction."

== U.S. Supreme Court ==
The Colorado Republican Party appealed the ruling in Anderson v. Griswold to the Supreme Court of the United States on December 27, which indefinitely extended the Colorado Supreme Court's stay on the ruling. Trump appealed the ruling on January 3, 2024, and the Supreme Court granted the case on an accelerated schedule on January 5, with oral arguments held February 8.

=== Briefs and amici curiae ===
Trump's brief on the merits presented several arguments in support of reversing the decision by Colorado's Supreme Court. Trump's main argument is that Section 3 does not apply to the president as the president should not be considered an "officer of the United States" within the meaning of Section 3. The respondents reply in their own brief, "Presidents ... are 'officers' because they hold an 'office'". They frame the case using evidence of the January 6 attack on the Capitol and argue that Trump engaged in insurrection within the meaning of Section 3 of the Fourteenth Amendment, whereas Trump's brief claims that he had not because he did not personally engage in violence at the Capitol. While Trump's brief claims that his speech at the Ellipse was protected by the First Amendment, theirs argues that it was not because it qualified as an inciting speech under Brandenburg v. Ohio. Whereas Trump's brief claims that disqualification under Section 3 of the Fourteenth Amendment is limited to holding office, as opposed to running for office, theirs maintains that states have authority to "exclude constitutionally ineligible candidates from the ballot", pointing to routine state practices such as exclusion of those not naturally born in the United States.

Trump's brief also urged the Supreme Court to rule in his favor, as a ruling upholding Colorado's decision would encourage, in other states, similar efforts "which threaten to disenfranchise tens of millions of Americans and which promise to unleash chaos and bedlam". The brief from the respondents construes that as a threat, but advised enforcing Section 3 of the Fourteenth Amendment to avoid empowering Trump to cause mayhem similar to that which arose "when he was on the ballot and lost".

Amici curiae filed in favor of Trump include a joint brief filed by the Republican National Committee (RNC) and the National Republican Congressional Committee (NRCC), and a brief from the National Republican Senatorial Committee, both citing concerns that Colorado's actions would lead other states to remove presidential candidates from ballots on purely political reasons, and a joint statement from about 180 Republican Congresspersons, led by Ted Cruz and Steve Scalise, who argued that Colorado's action stripped the power from the U.S. Congress in holding of Section 3. The brief from the RNC and NRCC urged the Supreme Court to use a textualist reading, citing Justice Antonin Scalia; Trump's brief also urged a textualist reading.

Briefs filed in support of Colorado include one from twenty-five American Civil War and Reconstruction historians, including Allan Lichtman, James M. McPherson, Vernon Burton, Manisha Sinha, Paul D. Escott, Brooks D. Simpson and Harry L. Watson, explaining the intent of the authors of Section 3 of the Fourteenth Amendment to include the presidency, and arguing that that section does not require any further congressional action for enablement; a response of several conservative judges and lawyers led by J. Michael Luttig, arguing that courts have authority to decide the issue, and urging the Supreme Court to use a textualist reading that grants Section 3 of the Fourteenth Amendment its "fair meaning"; and one from the Colorado Secretary of State, Jena Griswold, arguing that the state should be able to rely on its own judicial process to deem if a candidate is qualified to be on the ballot. In its brief, the Constitutional Accountability Center urged the court to follow Scalia's textualist concurrence in NLRB v. Canning, which pointed towards the president being an officer of the U.S.

=== Oral arguments ===
At oral arguments, Trump was represented by Jonathan F. Mitchell, the voters who filed the original request were represented by Jason Murray, and Secretary Griswold by Shannon Stevenson of the Colorado Attorney General's office. Justices on both ideological sides appeared to be skeptical of the claim that individual states may determine eligibility under the Fourteenth Amendment, according to observers. Instead, the justices generally asked questions that pointed to the Fourteenth Amendment requiring Congress to take the initiative of this determination. Justice Kavanaugh brought up an 1869 Virginia district court case, Griffin's Case, ruled a year after the Fourteenth Amendment was passed, by Justice Salmon Chase, acting in his capacity as an appellate judge, in which the court found that an insurrectionist ban against a judge could not be passed unless Congress passed a law. Justices raised few questions related to the events of January 6.

=== Ruling ===
In an unsigned per curiam opinion issued March 4, 2024, the Court unanimously ruled that, as set forth in Section 5 of the Fourteenth Amendment, Congress has the exclusive power to enforce Section 3 of the Fourteenth Amendment; as such, the courts (federal or otherwise) cannot declare a candidate ineligible for office under the said Section 3 unless an Act of Congress explicitly grants them that power. Further, the opinion stated that "states have no power under the Constitution to enforce Section 3 with respect to federal offices, especially the presidency". The opinion also expressed concern that if this power was left to the states, it would create chaos ahead and after the election and may disenfranchise voters.

While all nine justices agreed that the Fourteenth Amendment grants this power to the federal government, and not to the individual states, two separate opinions were issued. Justice Amy Coney Barrett concurred in the Court's decision that states cannot enforce Section 3 against federal officials, but wrote that the Court should not have addressed "the complicated question whether federal legislation is the exclusive vehicle through which Section 3 can be enforced." Justices Sonia Sotomayor, Elena Kagan, and Ketanji Brown Jackson, in an opinion co-signed by all three Justices, concurred in the judgment, but said that the Court went beyond what was needed for the case and should not have declared that Congress has the exclusive power to decide Section 3 eligibility questions, stating that the Court's opinion had decided "novel constitutional questions to insulate this court and petitioner [Trump] from future controversy."

== See also ==
- Aftermath of the January 6 United States Capitol attack
- Barack Obama presidential eligibility litigation
- United States presidential eligibility legislation
- Trump v. United States (2024)
