= Couy Griffin =

American former politician (born 1973)

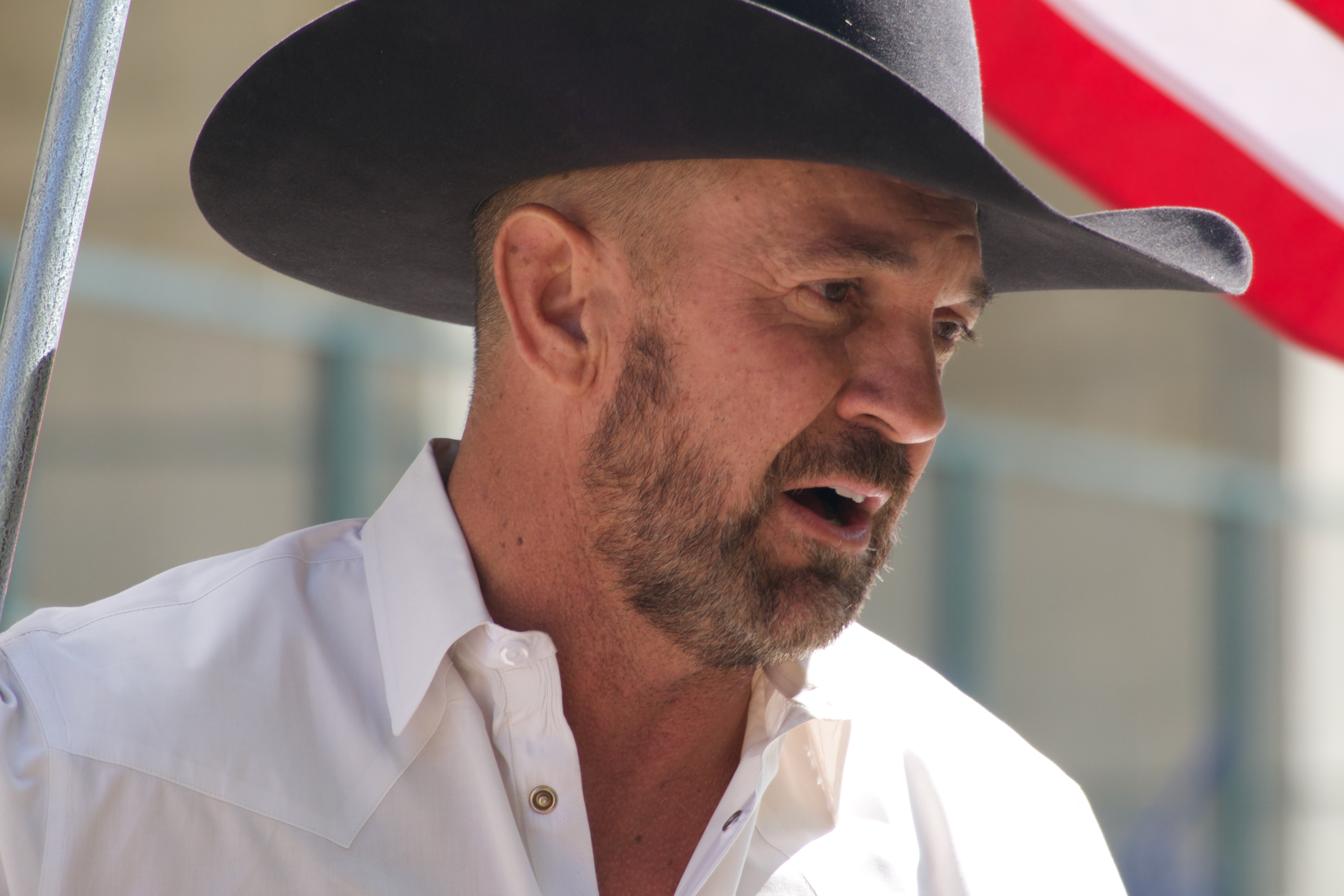
- Griffin in 2024

Member of the Otero County Board of Commissioners from the 2nd district
- In office 2019 – September 6, 2022
- Preceded by: Susan Flores
- Succeeded by: Stephanie DuBois

Personal details
- Born: 1973 (age 52–53) New Mexico, U.S.
- Party: Republican

Couy Dale Griffin (born 1973) is an American former politician who served from 2019 to 2022 as a county commissioner for District 2 of Otero County, New Mexico, which covers Tularosa, Three Rivers, La Luz, the western parts of Alamogordo, and the Mescalero Apache Reservation. In September 2022, Griffin was removed from office pursuant to the Insurrection Clause of the Fourteenth Amendment to the United States Constitution due to his actions in the January 6 United States Capitol attack, for which he was pardoned in January 2025. He is a member of the Republican Party.

== Tenure on the Otero County Commission ==
In 2018, incumbent district 2 commissioner Susan Flores did not seek re-election, and Griffin joined the race to succeed her. On June 5, Griffin won the Republican primary with 708 votes (55%) against Christopher Rupp and Gregory Bose, who garnered 252 (20%) and 317 (25%) votes respectively. Griffin won the general election on November 6, 2018, with 3,090 votes (65%) against Democrat Christopher Jones with 1,635 votes. He took office in January 2019.

In May 2020, Griffin stated and repeated the assertion that "the only good Democrat is a dead Democrat," while adding after applause that he spoke only in a political sense, "because the Democrat agenda and policy is anti-American right now." A week and a half later, his political action committee, Cowboys for Trump, tweeted out footage of the moment, which President Donald Trump retweeted. In an interview, Griffin expressed gratitude "that the president of the United States has my back."

Amid Donald Trump's false claims of election fraud in the 2020 presidential election, the county commission aligned itself with groups that baselessly claimed voter fraud. The county commissioners hired a firm run by election conspiracy promoter Shiva Ayyadurai, who had worked on a partisan audit of the election results in Maricopa County, Arizona. As with Maricopa County's audit of the election results, no evidence of fraud was found in the results for Otero County.

In 2021, a committee began circulating a petition to recall Griffin from office, accusing him of missing numerous county meetings, improperly filing a travel voucher, acting in a way that got him banned from the Mescalero Apache Reservation, and using county resources to further his group Cowboys for Trump. The committee fell short of the required signatures, getting only 1,229 of the required 1,574 signatures by the September 29 deadline.

On three occasions in 2022, an Otero County resident who attended public county commission meetings was silenced by Griffin; on at least one occasion, Griffin ordered sheriff's deputies to remove the citizen from the meeting. The resident, represented by the American Civil Liberties Union of New Mexico, subsequently received a $45,000 settlement from Otero County. In announcing the settlement, the man said: "I was mocked, yelled at, silenced, and roughly thrown out of public hearings simply because I had a different opinion than the predominant conservative view – namely that the election wasn't stolen. I was treated like someone who committed a crime. I hope this settlement makes clear that all Otero County residents, regardless of their political background, have the right to express their opinions freely without intimidation at county commission meetings."

Following the July 2022 primary election, Griffin and the two other Otero County commissioners initially refused to certify the election results for Otero County, and making baseless suggestions of some irregularity in the counting. New Mexico Secretary of State Maggie Toulouse Oliver sued the commission, seeking to compel it to complete its certification duty. After the New Mexico Supreme Court ordered the commission to certify the election, the two other commissioners relented and complied, enacting the certification via a majority vote, but Griffin refused. Griffin said of his stance: "It's not based on any facts. It's only based on my gut feeling and my own intuition, and that's all I need." Toulouse Oliver said that the state supreme court's decision prevented a breakdown in the election system and condemned "rogue" officials whose actions risked "completely disenfranchising all of the voters who came out in their county and not seeing their candidates move on to the general election."

== Cowboys for Trump ==
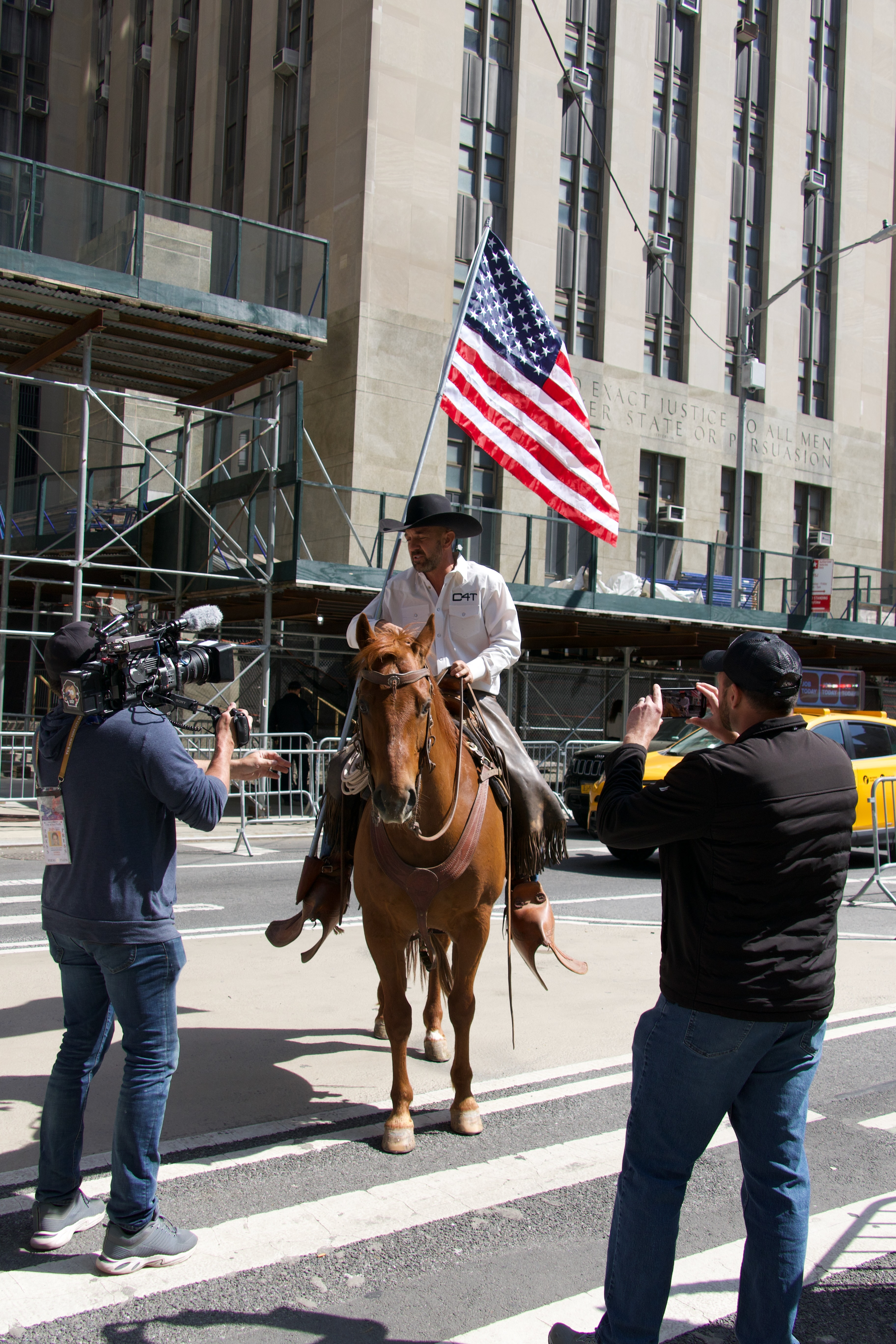
Griffin on a horse, outside the prosecution of Donald Trump in New York in May 2024

Griffin is the founder of the group Cowboys for Trump. Originally it had 13 members. Members of the political action committee (PAC) rode horseback to political events and protests.

=== Travel voucher submitted ===
In September 2019, Griffin drove from New Mexico to Washington, D.C., to attend a conference representing Otero County. During the trip he towed his horse in a trailer. During the same trip he also traveled to New York City to participate in a September 11 parade in his capacity as a member of Cowboys For Trump. Upon completion of this trip Griffin submitted a travel voucher to the county to cover the entire cost of his travel expenses, which included a per diem and mileage at a cost of $3,247.48. The county finance director approved the voucher without verifying county policy on travel expenses. The county then approved increasing the District 2 Commissioner travel allotment to account for the expense of Griffin's trip that exceeded existing funds.

Citizens of the county discovered that the travel voucher violated county policy and that reimbursement should have only been for the cost to travel by air to Washington, D.C., and the per diem allotment for the two days he was there for the conference. As a result, Griffin repaid the entire travel voucher from donations received from local business owners. The state auditor was made aware of the violations and did an audit on county finances.

=== Failure to register as a PAC ===
During the state auditor's investigation of the travel voucher issue, it was discovered that Cowboys for Trump was not registered as a political action committee (PAC). The Secretary of State of New Mexico was notified, and Cowboys for Trump was required to register as a PAC under New Mexico's Campaign and Reporting Act, N.M. Stat. Ann. §§ 1-19-25 to −37. In a June 2020 arbitration decision, Cowboys for Trump was ordered to register as a PAC, submit reports on contributions and expenditures, and pay a $7,800 penalty, but Griffin did not comply. Cowboys for Trump sued New Mexico's secretary of state, alleging that New Mexico's statute that required the organization to register as a PAC was unconstitutional under the First Amendment. The federal district court dismissed the organization's challenge of the registration requirement, and in February 2022, the federal court of appeals affirmed the district court's decision.

A misdemeanor criminal charge was filed against Griffin for failing to register the group as a political action committee. In March 2023, following a two-day jury trial in Alamogordo, Griffin was acquitted of the campaign-finance charge.

== Participation in January 6 attack ==
=== Arrest ===
On January 6, 2021, Griffin participated in the attack on the United States Capitol, climbing over barriers and walls to gain access to a restricted area of the grounds. He did not enter the Capitol itself. Later that month, Griffin spoke during a recorded commission meeting stating he was going to go back to D.C. with his firearms for the inauguration of Joe Biden. Upon his return to D.C. on January 17, 2021, Griffin was arrested and charged with trespassing and disorderly conduct. He spent 20 days in pretrial detention at the D.C. Jail.

=== Conviction ===
The bench trial took place on March 22, 2022, with Judge Trevor McFadden presiding. Griffin was found guilty on the trespassing charge, but was acquitted of the "disorderly and disruptive conduct" charge. He was sentenced to 14 days in jail (that was satisfied by time served), a $3,000 fine, 60 days of community service, and supervised release for a duration of one year. Griffin appealed the conviction to the District of Columbia Court of Appeals, arguing that the government needed to prove that he knew a Secret Service protectee was present when he trespassed. On October 22, 2024, the court upheld his conviction, ruling that it was sufficient for the government to have proven that he knew he was entering a restricted area.

=== Removal from office ===
Subsequent to his 2022 conviction for the trespassing charge, a suit was filed by the group, Citizens for Responsibility and Ethics in Washington (CREW), and certain residents of New Mexico under Section 3 of the Fourteenth Amendment to the United States Constitution that would bar him from holding a public office for life due to his participation in the January 6 Capitol riots.

Following the Disqualification Clause of the Fourteenth Amendment, District Court Judge Francis J. Mathew removed Griffin from public office on September 6, 2022, due to his activities during the riot.

In October 2022, New Mexico governor Michelle Lujan Grisham appointed Stephanie DuBois to Griffin's vacant seat on the commission. DuBois owns a dog grooming business and formerly served as chair of the Otero County Democratic Party. Republicans criticized Lujan Grisham for appointing a Democrat to a seat which had been Republican-held. DuBois ran for a full term in the November 2022 election but was defeated by Republican Amy Barela, a car salvage business owner and former chair of the Otero County Republican Party.

Griffin may never hold a public office again unless the debarment is overruled by a higher court or an Act of Congress. Removal of Griffin from his office marked the first instance of a democratically elected official being disqualified from holding public office under the constitutional provision since the disqualification of the socialist, Victor Berger, in 1919 by a special committee of Congress.

Griffin appealed the case to the New Mexico Supreme Court, which dismissed the appeal on procedural grounds in November, and reaffirmed this dismissal in February 2023.

Griffin appealed again, this time to the Supreme Court of the United States, attempting to rely on the court's ruling in Trump v. Anderson, but the court rejected his appeal without comment on March 18, 2024. His removal from office under section three of the Fourteenth Amendment of the United States Constitution was the first removal under that amendment of an office holder who participated in the January 6 insurrection, and he is barred from holding public office again in New Mexico.

== 2023 arrest in incident with renter ==
In May 2023, in an unrelated incident, Griffin was arrested for two counts of harassment and three counts of trespassing. A dispute began in April 2023 when Griffin sought to evict a renter from a property which Griffin's family owned, which led to complaints and ultimately charges against Griffin. Griffin pleaded not guilty.

== Electoral history ==
2018 Otero County 2nd Commission District Republican primary election
Party	Candidate	Votes	%
Republican	Couy Griffin	708	55.44%
Republican	Gregory J. Bose	317	24.82%
Republican	Christopher W. Rupp	252	19.73%
Total votes		1,277	100%

2018 Otero County 2nd Commission District election
Party	Candidate	Votes	%
Republican	Couy Griffin	3,090	65.40%
Democratic	Christopher S. Jones	1,635	34.60%
Total votes		4,725	100%
Republican hold			

== See also ==
- List of cases of the January 6 United States Capitol attack (G-L)
- Criminal proceedings in the January 6 United States Capitol attack
- List of people granted executive clemency in the second Trump presidency
