= Janice Marchman =

American politician

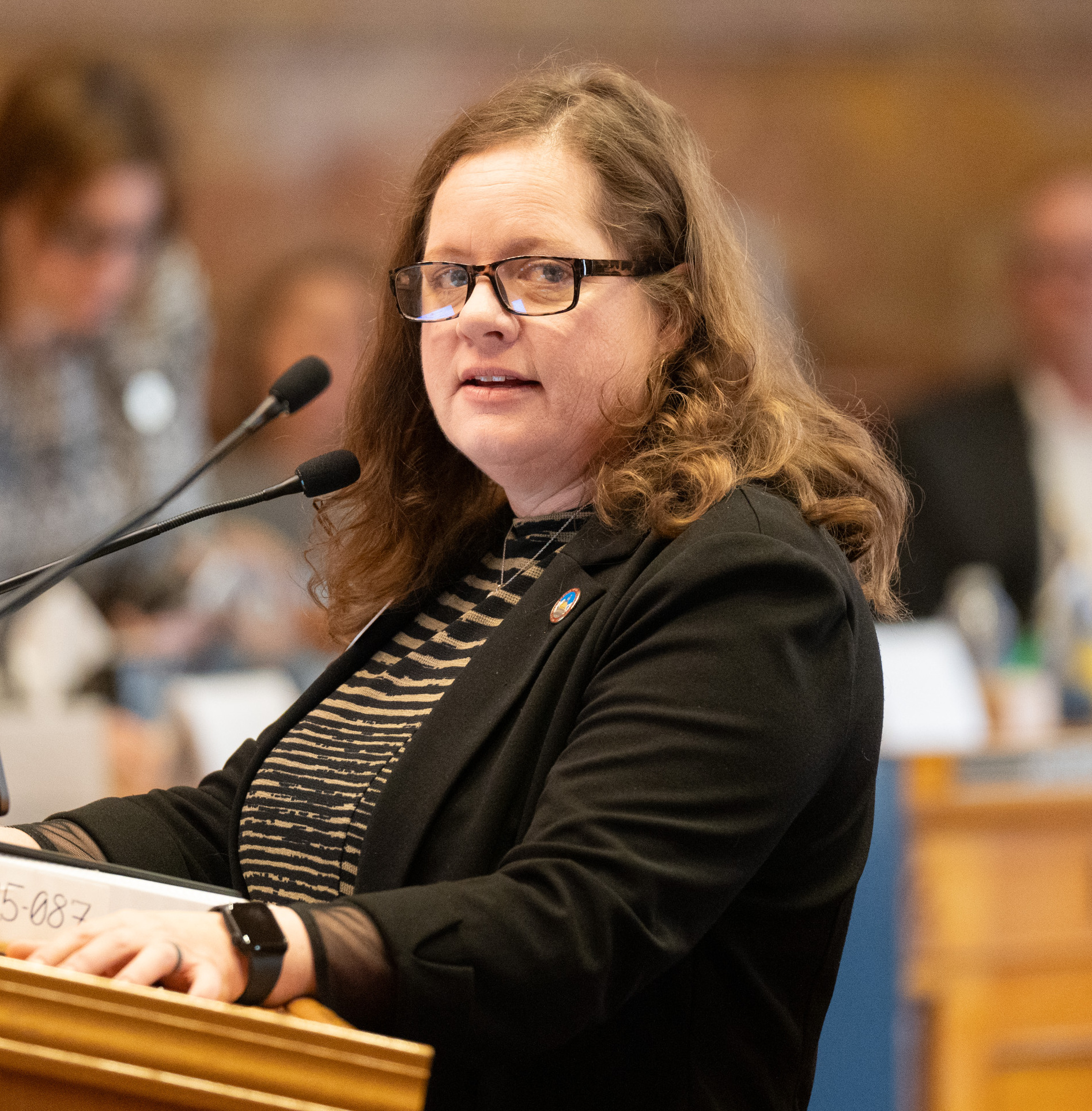

Member of the Colorado Senate from the 15th district
- Incumbent
- Assumed office January 9, 2023
- Preceded by: Rob Woodward

Personal details
- Party: Democratic
- Education: Georgia Tech (BS)

Janice Mallory Marchman is an American politician who is a member of the Colorado Senate for the 15th district. Elected in November 2022, she assumed office on January 9, 2023.

== Early life and education ==
Marchman was born on a United States Air Force base while her father was serving as a pilot. She earned a Bachelor of Science in industrial and systems engineering from Georgia Tech.

== Career ==
Janice Marchman moved to Loveland in 2005 and became involved in local school district committees before being elected to the school board, where she served as vice president.

Before entering politics, Marchman worked as a business consultant and master scheduler. She joined the Thompson School District in 2016, teaching math and computer classes part-time. She was elected to the Colorado Senate in November 2022, defeating incumbent Republican Rob Woodward.
