= Steve Johnson (Colorado politician) =

American politician (born 1960)

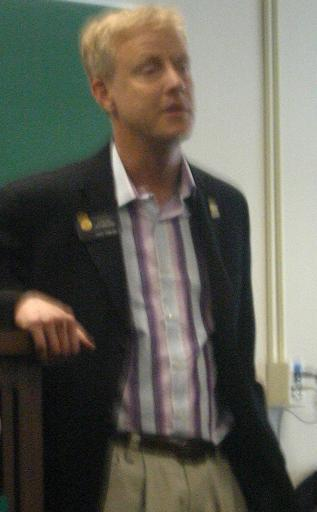

Member of the Colorado Senate from the 15th district
- In office January 8, 2003 – January 6, 2009
- Preceded by: Stan Matsunaka
- Succeeded by: Kevin Lundberg

Member of the Colorado House of Representatives from the 49th district
- In office January 1997 – January 8, 2003
- Succeeded by: Kevin Lundberg

Personal details
- Born: April 21, 1960 (age 66) Columbus, Ohio
- Party: Republican
- Spouse: Lynette
- Profession: Veterinarian, educator

Steve Johnson (born April 21, 1960) is an American former politician. He was a county commissioner of Larimer County, Colorado, and a Republican member of the Colorado Senate. From 2003 to 2009, Johnson represented the 15th Senate district, encompassing rural Larimer County and the cities of Loveland and Estes Park. Previously he was a member of the Colorado House of Representatives from 1997 through 2002.

== Biography ==
Johnson holds a bachelor's degree in chemistry and a D.V.M. from Colorado State University, Johnson worked as a veterinarian in Loveland, Colorado, and currently works as a county supervisor for Larimer County. He has taught science at Heritage Christian High School. Johnson is married and has no children.

Johnson was a member of the Larimer County Planning Commission from 1987 to 1996, and was first elected to the State House in 1996. In 2002, he was elected to the State Senate over Democrat Kathy Gilliland, and was re-elected in 2006, defeating Democrat Jennifer Miller. In the 2007-2008 session of the Colorado General Assembly, Johnson sat on the powerful Joint Budget Committee and the Senate Appropriations Committee.

A moderate Republican, Johnson was the State Senate sponsor for Referendum C, a statewide measure to remove TABOR restrictions on the state budget; his sponsorship put him at odds with other fiscally conservative Republicans. In addition to his work on the six-member Joint Budget Committee preparing the state budget, Johnson has expressed priorities of expanding funding to higher education and re-opening the state drivers' license office in Loveland./ The office reopened on May 16, 2008.

In June 2007, Johnson — otherwise healthy and athletic, having recently taken second place in a legislative fitness challenge — suffered a heart attack. That same summer, Johnson taught an organic chemistry class at Colorado State University. Since then, Johnson has placed a renewed emphasis on affordable healthcare, calling it a "moral issue" for the Republican Party.

In January 2008, Johnson, facing the end of his senate tenure in 2010, announced his candidacy for a seat on the Larimer County Board of Commissioners.

He was elected in 2008, in 2012 without opposition, and again in 2016.

In 2015, Johnson was named Colorado Commissioner of the Year by the state-wide County Commissioner organization, Colorado Counties, Inc.

He retired from politics in 2021.
