= Perry Buck =

American politician

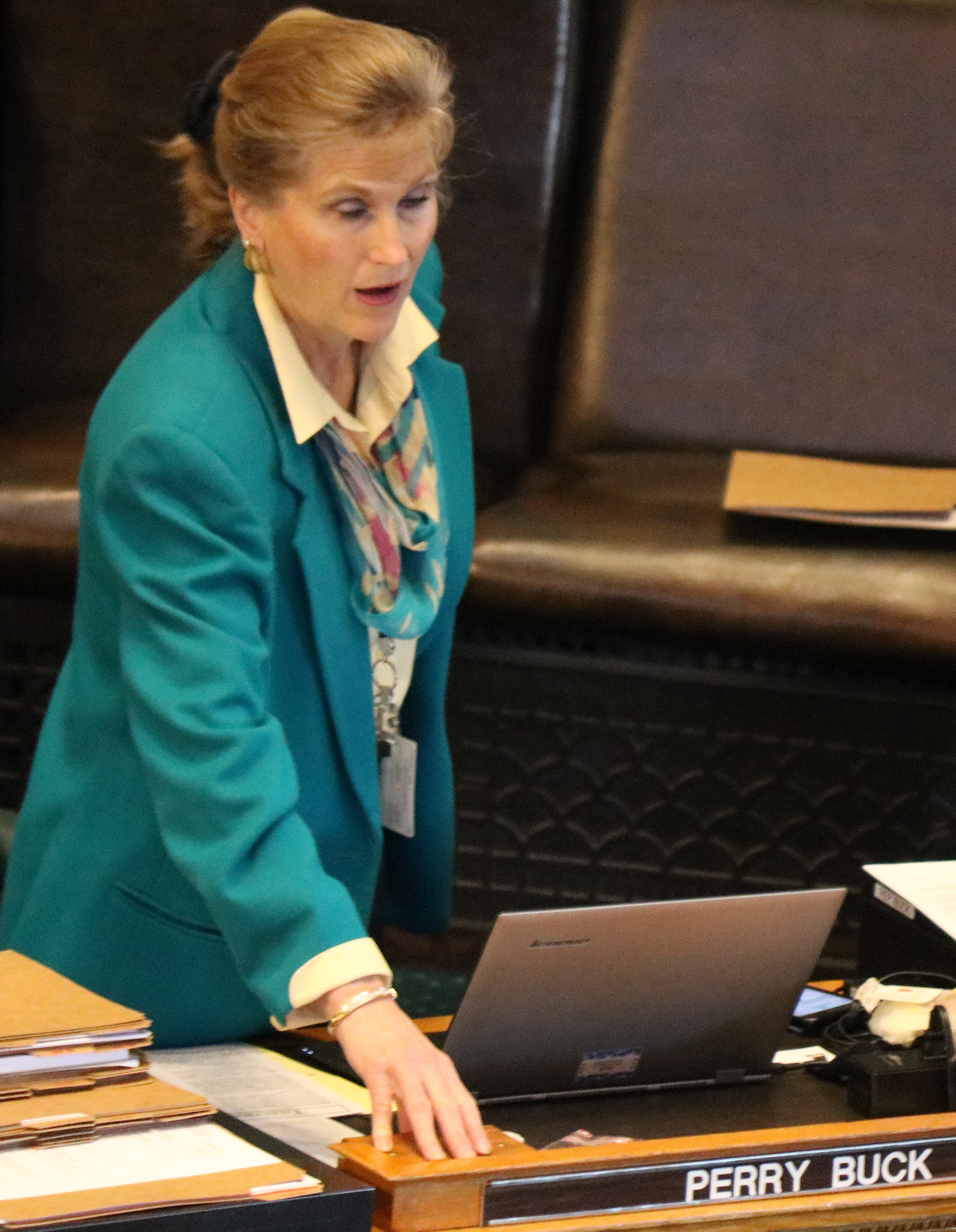
- Buck in 2018

Member of the Weld County Board of County Commissioners from the at-large district
- Incumbent
- Assumed office January 1, 2021
- Preceded by: Kevin Ross

Member of the Colorado House of Representatives from the 49th district
- In office January 9, 2013 – January 13, 2021
- Preceded by: B.J. Nikkel
- Succeeded by: Mike Lynch

Personal details
- Party: Republican
- Spouse: Ken Buck (m. 1996; div. 2018)
- Children: 2
- Education: Pepperdine University (BA)
- Website: perryforcolorado.com

Perry Buck (née Webster, born 1961 or 1962) is an American politician who serves as a County Commissioner in Weld County, Colorado. Previously, she served as a Republican member of the Colorado House of Representatives, representing District 49 from January 9, 2013, to January 13, 2021.

== Education and political career ==
In 1984, Buck earned a Bachelor of Arts degree in English from Pepperdine University.

In the aftermath of the 2020 presidential election, on December 7, 2020, Buck and seven other Republicans demanded that Speaker of the House KC Becker form a committee on "election integrity" to conduct an audit of the Dominion Voting Systems used in Colorado's 2020 elections in spite of no evidence of issues. The request was rejected, with Becker criticizing it as a promotion of "debunked conspiracy theories."

== Elections ==
- 2012 When District 49 incumbent Republican Representative B.J. Nikkel left the Legislature and left the seat open, Buck ran unopposed for the June 26, 2012 Republican Primary, winning with 5,857 votes, and won the November 6, 2012 General election with 28,053 votes (58.4%) against Democratic nominee James Shelton.
- 2020 Buck was elected to the Weld County Board of Commissioners.

== Personal life ==
Buck and her former husband, Ken Buck, announced their divorce on November 9, 2018, three days after his reelection to the U.S. House of Representatives from Colorado's 4th district.
