= Kevin Lundberg =

American politician

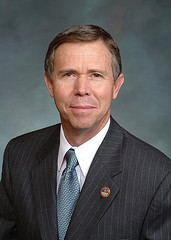

Member of the Colorado Senate from the 15th district
- In office January 15, 2009 – January 4, 2019
- Preceded by: Steve Johnson
- Succeeded by: Rob Woodward

Member of the Colorado House of Representatives from the 49th district
- In office January 8, 2003 – January 15, 2009
- Preceded by: Steve Johnson
- Succeeded by: B.J. Nikkel

Personal details
- Born: July 29, 1952 (age 74) Denver, Colorado, U.S.
- Party: Republican
- Spouse: Sandra Jayne "Sandy" Lundberg
- Occupation: Businessman

Kevin Lundberg (born July 29, 1952) is an American businessman and former legislator in the U.S. state of Colorado. Before his appointment to the State Senate in 2009 as a Republican, he was elected to serve as the Representative to House District 49 in the Colorado House of Representatives in 2003. He was appointed to the Colorado Senate in 2009, replacing Senator Steve Johnson after his resignation. He represented Senate District 15, which encompasses Berthoud, Estes Park, Laporte, Loveland, Red Feather Lakes and Wellington. In the 2015 legislative session he served as the Assistant Majority Leader for the Senate Republican caucus. From 2016 to early 2019, he served on the Joint Budget Committee and chaired the Senate Appropriations Committee.

In July 2017, Lundberg announced his candidacy for the Republican nomination for Colorado State Treasurer in the election to be held in 2018. However, he was defeated in the Republican primary election.

== Biography ==
Lundberg attended Rockmont College, where he earned a Bachelor of Arts degree from in the fields of history and social science. After graduation, Lundberg worked with his father as a custom harvester for twenty years before moving on to own and manage a private video production company, a business that he has grown and maintained for the past thirty years. In 1990, Lundberg also helped found the Christian Home Educators of Colorado, which later went on to recognize him as their "Legislator of the Year" in 2006.

Lundberg lives with his wife, Sandy, and their three children in Berthoud, Colorado.

== Colorado House of Representatives ==
Lundberg ran for office in 2002 and was elected to the Colorado House of Representatives to represent House District 49, defeating Taylor Stephens in the Republican primary but facing no general election opposition. Lundberg was re-elected in the three following elections, having defeated Democrat Doug Frisbie and Libertarian Alberto Squassabia in 2004, Democrat Sue Radford in 2006, and Democrat James Ross in 2008.

As three-term Representative for the 49th House District, Lundberg sponsored 400 House bills, 13 Senate bills, and 10 resolutions, 16 of which passed. Notable bills sponsored by Lundberg include repeated efforts to adopt a long-term Revenue Shortfall Relief Fund, measures to support home-based educators, support for the Federal Marriage Amendment, cost recovery and alternatives for seniors to Medicaid, and Pine Beetle mitigation. Lundberg also opposed Referendum C, a measure adopted by Coloradans in 2005 to temporarily suspend the revenue limits in the Colorado Taxpayer Bill of Rights.

Lundberg was the sole representative in the Colorado House of Representatives to vote against a resolution censuring fellow Representative Douglas Bruce for his kicking of a photographer during opening prayer on the house floor. Lundberg said of his vote, "It would seem logical that since this was the first censure in the 131 year history of the state, it must indicate that Representative Bruce's action was by far the worst impropriety shown on the House floor…What Representative Bruce did was wrong, and demonstrated poor judgment. I would have supported a rebuke, but to use the word censure is to use the strongest word of condemnation that a legislative body can employ."

== Colorado State Senate ==
=== 2009 Appointment ===
In January 2009, Lundberg was elected by vacancy committee to serve the remainder of State Senator Steve Johnson's term, which was vacated when Senator Johnson became a county commissioner for Larimer County. The vacancy committee elected Lundberg over his opponent Mike Lynch by a margin of 86 to 42.

=== 2009 Legislative Session ===
In the 2009 session, Senator Lundberg successfully sponsored a measure to require proper signage to warn motorists that traffic control cameras are in use at intersections, and a measure that allows school districts to use discretion in determining punishment for students in incidents of look-alike weapons on school grounds. The latter measure was prompted by an incident in which a student was suspended for having a practice drill team rifle in her vehicle on school grounds.

=== 2010 Election ===
Lundberg faced no opposition in the primary elections, and on November 2, 2010, Lundberg won a full 4-year term with 59.6 percent of the vote, defeating his Democratic opponent Richard Ball.

=== 2010 Legislative Session ===
Lundberg was responsible for several important pieces of legislation during the 2010 session. During his first session in the Colorado State Senate, Lundberg sponsored a measure that would have imposed several rules regarding voter registration drives. SB 10-104 would have required voter registration drive organizers to submit lists of to the Secretary of State prior to a drive certifying that each registrar had submitted a copy of photo id as well as an affidavit that the registrar had read the rules and regulations of conducting such a drive. The bill was sentenced to the Senate State, Veterans, and Military Affairs Committee where it failed to pass on a party-line 3-2 vote.

Lundberg also co-sponsored a piece of legislation with then State Representative Cory Gardner that would have increased the penalties on DUI penalties for repeat offenders. HB 10-1184 focused on increasing the penalty of a DUI for a repeat offender, making a third DUI conviction a class 6 felony in Colorado. The bill was sent to the House Judiciary Committee, where it was also postponed indefinitely on another party-line vote, failing by a 7-4 vote margin.

=== 2011 Legislative Session ===
Lundberg sponsored several measures during the 2011 session, one of which sought to develop a new alternative medical assistance program for the elderly. SB 11-006 focused on creating a voluntary medical assistance program for Medicaid-eligible patients, which would give Medicaid patients different options for their medical needs. The bill was directed to the Senate Committee on Health and Human Services, and Lundberg touted that the measure would have been more cost-efficient and saved the state money. The bill, however, was postponed indefinitely on a 7-2 vote.

During the 2011 legislative session, Lundberg received several accolades: Statesman of the Year from the Loveland 912 Project, Taxpayer Champion from the Colorado Union of Taxpayers, as well as the Colorado Common Sense in the Courtroom Colorado Civil Justice League.

=== 2012 Legislative Session ===
During the 2012 legislative session, Lundberg served on the Judiciary Committee and was the ranking Republican on the Health and Human Services Committee. He sponsored several bills during session, including a bill focusing on the development of an alternative medical assistance program for the elderly. Senate Bill 12-018 would allow Medicaid-eligible patients to choose any provider as well as allow the state to waive estate recovery fees after the patient's death. The bill failed in the Senate Health and Human Services Committee on a 6-3 vote.

Senator Lundberg was honored with the American Conservative Union's 2012 Defender of Liberty Award.

=== 2012 Congressional Campaign ===
Senator Lundberg announced his intention to vie for Colorado's 2nd House District Seat, a position held by Democratic incumbent Jared Polis. He faced Eric Weissmann in the primary election, an election that most touted Weissman would win; however, Lundberg won the primaries with 53.3% of the vote as opposed to Weissmann's 46.7% of the vote.

During the general election, Lundberg faced incumbent Jared Polis, Libertarian challenger Randy Luallian, and Green Party candidate Susan Hall. Lundberg was unsuccessful in his bid to unseat the incumbent, losing by a margin of 55.70% to 38.71%.

=== 2014 Legislative Session ===
2014 Election In the 2014 November election Senator Lundberg won re-election to serve his final four years as State Senator for the 15th Senate District. He was unopposed.

He was appointed to serve on the Senate Health and Human Services Committee, as well as the Judiciary Committee.

=== 2016 Legislative Session ===
Senator Lundberg received the Common Sense in the Courtroom award from the Colorado Civil Justice League.

In November 2016 Senator Lundberg was elected by the Senate Republican Caucus to serve as its second member on the Joint Budget Committee (JBC). He is also the Chairman of the Senate Appropriations Committee and the Health Exchange Oversight Committee.
