= Colorado's 15th Senate district =

American legislative district

Colorado's 15th State Senate district
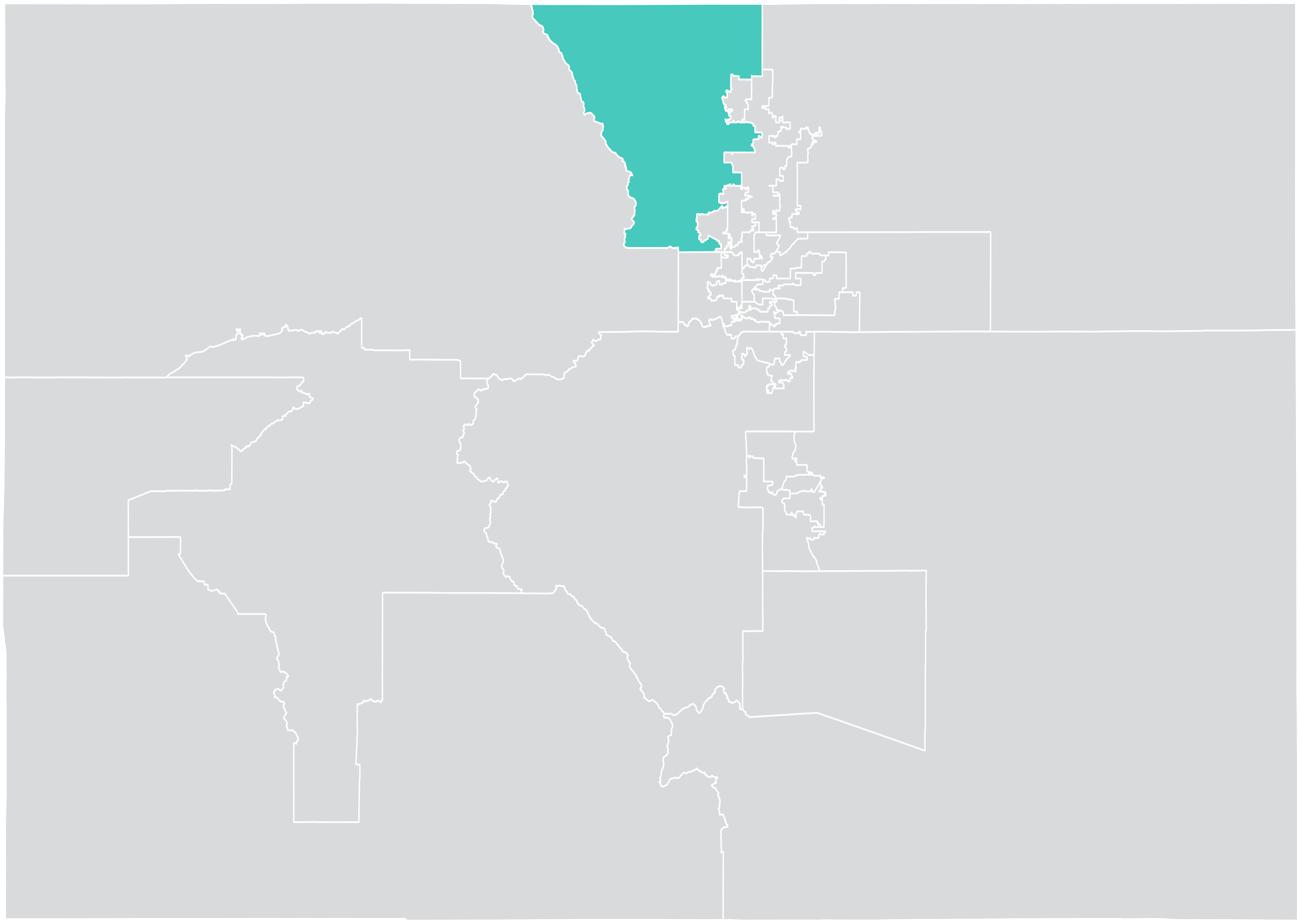
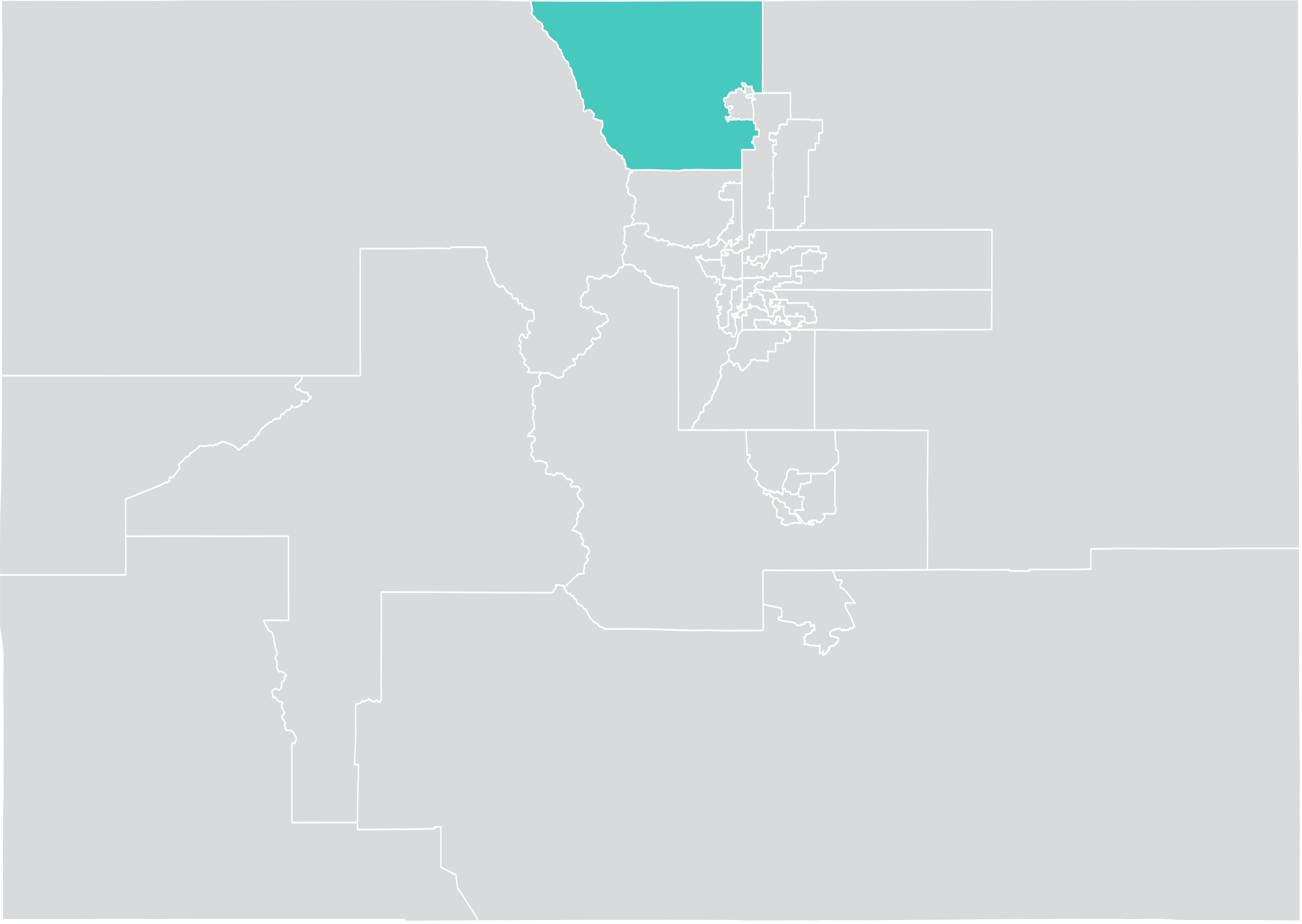
Senator
Janice Marchman; D–Loveland
- Registration: 25.4% Republican; 23.0% Democratic; 49.5% No party preference
- Demographics: 79% White; 2% Black; 15% Hispanic; 1% Asian; 2% Other
- Population (2018): 155,402
- Registered voters: 125,330

Colorado's 15th Senate district is one of 35 districts in the Colorado Senate. It has been represented by Democrat Janice Marchman since 2023. Prior to redistricting the district was represented by Republicans Rob Woodward and Kevin Lundberg.

== Geography ==
District 15 covers nearly all of Larimer County outside of Fort Collins, including the communities of Loveland, Estes Park, Berthoud, Wellington, and Laporte.

The district is located entirely within Colorado's 2nd congressional district, and overlaps with the 49th, 51st, 52nd, and 53rd districts of the Colorado House of Representatives.

== Recent election results ==
Colorado state senators are elected to staggered four-year terms; under normal circumstances, the 15th district holds elections in midterm years. The 2022 election will be the first held under the state's new district lines.

=== 2022 ===
2022 Colorado Senate election, District 15
Party	Candidate	Votes	%
Democratic	Janice Marchman	43,068	50.6
Republican	Rob Woodward (incumbent)	42,054	49.4
Total votes		85,122	100

== Historical election results ==
=== 2018 ===
2018 Colorado State Senate election, District 15
Party	Candidate	Votes	%
Republican	Rob Woodward	44,434	53.1
Democratic	Rebecca Cranston	39,256	46.9
Total votes		83,690	100
Republican hold			

=== 2014 ===
2014 Colorado State Senate election, District 15
Party	Candidate	Votes	%
Republican	Kevin Lundberg (incumbent)	47,581	100
Total votes		47,581	100
Republican hold			

=== Federal and statewide results ===
Year	Office	Results
2020	President	Trump 49.7 – 47.5%
2018	Governor	Stapleton 50.2 – 45.8%
2016	President	Trump 51.6 – 39.2%
2014	Senate	Gardner 54.6 – 39.5%
2014	Governor	Beauprez 51.8 – 43.3%
2012	President	Romney 52.5 – 44.8%
