= Right to sue =

The right to sue may refer to one of the following legal topics relating to a right to file a lawsuit ('sue' is the verb for the act of filing a lawsuit):

- Right to petition - the right to petition the government, which in some jurisdictions includes the right to file a lawsuit

- Right to petition in the United States - a right in the U.S. that includes, to a certain degree, the right to file a lawsuit
- Petition Clause of the First Amendment to the United States Constitution - a U.S. constitutional right that has been interpreted to give individuals the right to file a lawsuit, subject to some restrictions

- Notice of Right to Sue - letter from the United States (US) Equal Employment Opportunity Commission allowing an employee claiming employment discrimination to file a lawsuit in US federal court
- Notice of Right to Sue - letter from the California Department of Fair Employment and Housing allowing an employee claiming employment discrimination to file a lawsuit in California state court
