= California Motor Transport Co. v. Trucking Unlimited =

- Supreme Court of the United States

Argued November 10, 1971 Decided January 13, 1972
- Full case name: California Motor Transport Co. et al., Petitioners, v. Trucking Unlimited et al.
- Citations: 404 U.S. 508 (more) 92 S. Ct. 609; 30 L. Ed. 2d 642

Case history
- Prior: 432 F.2d 755 (9th Cir. 1970); cert. granted, 402 U.S. 1008 (1971).

Holding
- Citizens have the right to make petitions to all three branches of government, including agencies in the executive branch, the legislature, and the courts.

Court membership
- Chief Justice Warren E. Burger Associate Justices William O. Douglas · William J. Brennan Jr. Potter Stewart · Byron White; Thurgood Marshall · Harry Blackmun; Lewis F. Powell Jr. · William Rehnquist

Case opinions
- Majority: Douglas, joined by Burger, White, Marshall, Blackmun
- Concurrence: Stewart, Brennan
- Powell, Rehnquist took no part in the consideration or decision of the case.

Laws applied
- U.S. Const. amend I, Sherman Antitrust Act, Clayton Antitrust Act

California Motor Transport Co. v. Trucking Unlimited, 404 U.S. 508 (1972), is a landmark decision of the United States Supreme Court involving the right to make petitions to the government. The right to petition is enshrined in the First Amendment to the United States Constitution as: "Congress shall make no law...abridging...the right of the people...to petition the Government for a redress of grievances." This case involved the claim that one group of companies was using state and federal regulatory actions to eliminate competitors. The Supreme Court ruled that the right to petition is integral to the legal system but using lawful means to achieve unlawful restraint of trade is not protected in some instances.

== Antitrust law ==
Antitrust law is the body of laws that exist in order to prevent companies from suppressing market competition from other companies. The Sherman Antitrust Act was a landmark piece of federal legislation passed in 1890 and "intended to prevent all contracts, combinations, and conspiracies which restrain or monopolize trade." The Clayton Antitrust Act followed in 1914 and allowed parties injured by anti-competitive actions to sue the violators for both injunctive relief (meaning the anti-competitive action had to stop) and treble damages (meaning the actual monetary damages suffered by the injured party would be multiplied by three times when determining the award granted).

In two cases interpreting these laws (Eastern Railroad Conference v. Noerr Motor Freight Inc. and United Mine Workers v. Pennington), the Supreme Court had created the Noerr–Pennington doctrine. Based on the right to petition under the First Amendment, the Court had ruled in these cases that attempts to influence the passage or enforcement of laws were not antitrust law violations even if such lobbying had the incidental effect of restricting competition. The Court in Noerr recognized an exception, however, in those cases in which the lobbying or other petitioning activity "is a mere sham to cover what is actually nothing more than an attempt to interfere directly with the business relationships of a competitor."

== Prior history ==
This case originated as a business dispute between two groups of trucking companies operating in California. Trucking companies in that state were regulated at that time by both the state's Public Utilities Commission (PUC) and the federal Interstate Commerce Commission (ICC). In order to legally operate as a trucking company, both regulatory authorities needed to grant operating rights to a business.

Trucking Unlimited was the lead plaintiff for a group of fourteen companies that accused California Motor Transport Co. and eighteen others of creating a war chest which they used to oppose any PUC and ICC applications for operating rights by other companies and also to finance court cases stemming from PUC or ICC decisions. In this way, the established companies were accused of using government regulators to effect a restraint of trade by potential new competitors. The defendants were alleged to have pursued this strategy regardless of the merits of their opposition to their competitors' applications simply to increase their competitors' costs and to discourage, delay or prevent their entry into the California transport industry.

The action was dismissed by the federal District Court for "failure to state a claim upon which relief can be granted". This is a pretrial motion available under the Federal Rules of Civil Procedure premised on the argument that, even if everything the plaintiff said is true, there is no breach of any duty owed to the plaintiff or violation of the plaintiff's rights.

This ruling was appealed to the Ninth Circuit Court of Appeals. The appeals court ruled that the Noerr and Pennington cases did not apply to "...a conspiracy to unreasonably restrain or monopolize trade through the use of judicial and administrative adjudicative proceedings." It ruled that the dismissal was improper and directed the case back to the District Court for trial.

== Decision ==
The Supreme Court, however, granted California Motor Transport's petition for review before the case was remanded; it heard the parties' arguments on November 10, 1971. The Court delivered its decision on January 13, 1972.

The decision by Justice Douglas began by reviewing the Noerr-Pennington doctrine and reiterating the importance of the Right to Petition:

We conclude that it would be destructive of rights of association and of petition to hold that groups with common interests may not, without violating the antitrust laws, use the channels and procedures of state and federal agencies and courts to advocate their causes and points of view respecting resolution of their business and economic interests vis-a -vis their competitors.

The Court went on to note, however, that, like other First Amendment rights, the right to petition is not absolute. In Noerr, the Court had said in passing that this right would not protect companies when the lobbying actions were "a mere sham" to conceal activities intended to directly interfere with competitors. Justice Douglas went on to distinguish between influencing public officials, which was allowed, and denying competitors access to government decision-makers and usurping regulatory processes for commercial ends. Both the plaintiffs and the defendants had a right to access the judiciary and regulatory tribunals. First Amendment rights could not be used as a pretext to inflict direct harm. The allegations made by Trucking Unlimited should not have been dismissed because they accused California Motor Transport Co. of undertaking exactly this type of subversion of the regulatory process. The Court affirmed the judgment of the Ninth Circuit and remanded it to the District Court for trial.

Justice Stewart, joined by Justice Brennan, concurred in the decision. Justice Stewart took issue with what he considered to be an unwarranted infringement by the majority opinion of the immunity that First Amendment petitioning activities should enjoy under the antitrust laws, but concurred that the case was properly remanded to the District Court for trial to give the plaintiffs the opportunity to prove that the real intent of the defendants in opposing every ICC and PUC application by the plaintiffs was "not to invoke the processes of the administrative agencies and courts, but to discourage and ultimately to prevent the respondents from invoking those processes."

== Effects of the decision ==
This case both extended and modified the Noerr-Pennington doctrine:

1. The Court extended the protection of that doctrine to all departments of the government, including Article I and Article III tribunals.
2. The Court affirmed the critical role that the First Amendment right to petition plays in the Noerr-Pennington doctrine allowing companies to lobby for governmental action that might cause disadvantages to competitors.
3. The Court elaborated on the "sham" exception under the Noerr-Pennington doctrine to deny protection in those cases in which a competitor does not hope to influence public officials but instead tries to deny other businesses meaningful access to those tribunals.

Noerr-Pennington immunity from the Sherman Act would not apply to California Motor Transport Co. and its co-conspirators because their actions before the PUC, the ICC, and the courts were not an actual exercise of their right to petition, but a fraudulent attempt to prevent Trucking Unlimited and others from entering the marketplace by denying them access to those tribunals.

== See also ==
- List of United States Supreme Court cases, volume 404
- List of United States Supreme Court cases
