= A.D. Bedell Wholesale Co., Inc. v. Philip Morris Inc. =

- Court: United States Court of Appeals for the Third Circuit
- Full case name: A.D. Bedell Wholesale Co., Inc.; Triangle Candy & Tobacco Co., on behalf of themselves and all others similarly situated v. Philip Morris Incorporated; R.J. Reynolds Tobacco Company, Inc.; Brown and Williamson Tobacco Corp.
- Argued: December 14, 2000
- Decided: June 19, 2001
- Citation: 263 F.3d 239

Case history
- Prior history: On Appeal from the United States District Court for the Western District of Pennsylvania.
- Subsequent history: Certiorari Denied January 7, 2002

Court membership
- Judges sitting: Anthony Joseph Scirica, Julio M. Fuentes Leonard I. Garth

Case opinions
- Majority: Scirica

A.D. Bedell Wholesale Co., Inc. v. Philip Morris Inc., 263 F.3d 239 (3d Cir. 2001), was an early appellate case testing the legality of the Tobacco Master Settlement Agreement (MSA), in this instance whether it could properly be alleged to violate the Sherman Antitrust Act.

== Procedural history ==
Cigarette wholesalers sued tobacco companies who were parties to the Tobacco MSA (collectively, the "Majors", who were responsible for 98% of cigarette sales in the United States). The complaint from A.D. Bedell of Salamanca, New York and other distributors alleged that the multibillion-dollar settlement with the states violated 15 U.S.C.S. §§ 1 and 2 of the Sherman Antitrust Act. The United States District Court for the Western District of Pennsylvania dismissed for failure to state a claim under Fed. R. Civ. P. 12(b)(6), on the grounds that the tobacco companies were immune from antitrust liability under the Noerr-Pennington and Parker immunity doctrines.

== Parties' arguments ==
The wholesalers were challenging two sections of the MSA as creating an output cartel that imposes draconian monetary penalties for increasing cigarette production beyond 1998 levels and effectively bars new entry into the cigarette market:

- the so-called "Renegade Clause" (which refer to small cigarette producers or "renegades" who generally sell at a discount), the settlement's primary mechanism for allocating payment responsibilities based on production levels. See MSA §§ IX(i) (SMPs), (d) (NPMs)
- the provision calling for "Qualifying Statutes," which are state laws passed as a result of commitments made in the Multistate Settlement Agreement that require Non-Participating Manufacturers to pay into state escrow accounts for each sale made.

Together, the Renegade Clause, the Qualifying Statutes and the Enforcement Fund allegedly created severe obstacles to market entry, or to increasing production and market share. In fact, the Multistate Settlement Agreement explicitly proclaims its purpose to reduce the ability of non-signatory cigarette manufacturers to seize market share because of the competitive advantage accruing from not contributing to the settlement. It declares that the agreement "effectively and fully neutralizes the cost disadvantages that the Participating Manufacturers experience vis-a-vis Non-Participating Manufacturers with such Settling States as a result of the provisions of this Agreement." MSA § IX(d)(2)(E) It was these barriers to entry and increased production that plaintiffs claimed form an output cartel that violates the antitrust laws. Because output is restricted and because of the inelastic demand for cigarettes, in part due to their addictive nature, the Multistate Settlement Agreement allegedly permitted the Majors to raise their prices to near monopoly levels—levels allegedly above those necessary to fund the settlement payments.

Defendants contended the Multistate Settlement Agreement did not violate the antitrust laws, but even if so, they are immune under both the Noerr-Pennington doctrine, which protects petitioning activity, and the Parker doctrine, which protects sovereign acts of states from antitrust liability.

== Held ==
- an antitrust violation was properly pled, in alleging that the tobacco companies had agreed to form an output cartel through the national settlement agreement with the states.
- the lower court erred, in that the tobacco companies were not immune from liability under the Parker doctrine: the states' supervision under the terms of the settlement agreement did not reach those parts of the agreement that were the source of the antitrust injury, i.e., cigarette pricing and production. Parker v. Brown under the Noerr-Pennington doctrine because there was no reason to distinguish between settlement agreements and other aspects of litigation between private actors and the government that gave rise to antitrust immunity.
