= Right to petition =

Right to communicate one's needs to government

The right to petition government for redress of grievances is the right to make a complaint to, or seek the assistance or remedy of, one's government, without fear of punishment or reprisals.

The right can be traced back to the Bill of Rights 1689, the Petition of Right (1628), and Magna Carta (1215).

In Europe, Article 44 of the Charter of Fundamental Rights of the European Union ensures the right to petition to the European Parliament. Basic Law for the Federal Republic of Germany guarantees the right of petition to "competent authorities and to the legislature". The right to petition in the United States is granted by the First Amendment to the United States Constitution (1791).

== United States ==
The prohibition of abridgment of the "right to petition" originally referred only to the Congress and the U.S. federal courts. The incorporation doctrine later expanded the protection of the right to its current scope, over all state and federal courts and legislatures, and the executive branches of the state and federal governments.

== China ==
Ancient and Imperial Chinese dynasties recognised the right to petition for all subjects. Commoners could petition the Emperor to remove local officials. The Huabiao, a ceremonial column common in traditional Chinese architecture, is believed to have originated from signboards set up by ancient rulers to offer an avenue for the public to write petitions.

In modern China the use of local petitioning bureaus remains common, however, those who remain dissatisfied still travel to the capital as a last resort to appeal to the central government. The National Public Complaints and Proposals Administration (Chinese: 国家信访局) and local bureaus of letters and calls receive suggestions and grievances. The officers then channel the issues to respective departments and monitor the progress of settlement, which they feedback to the filing parties. If unsatisfied, they can move up the hierarchy to bring complaints to the next higher level.

== See also ==
- Strategic lawsuit against public participation
- We the People (petitioning system)
- Bill of Rights, the 1689 bill of rights passed by the Parliament of England
- Seven Bishops
