= Noerr–Pennington doctrine =

Principle in US antitrust law

Under the Noerr–Pennington doctrine, private entities are immune from liability under the antitrust laws for attempts to influence the passage or enforcement of laws, even if the laws they advocate for would have anticompetitive effects. The doctrine is grounded in the First Amendment protection of political speech, and "upon a recognition that the antitrust laws, 'tailored as they are for the business world, are not at all appropriate for application in the political arena.'"

== Origins ==
The doctrine was set forth by the United States Supreme Court in Eastern Railroad Presidents Conference v. Noerr Motor Freight, Inc. and United Mine Workers v. Pennington. The Court later expanded on the doctrine in California Motor Transport Co. v. Trucking Unlimited.

In Noerr, the Court held that "no violation of the [Sherman] Act can be predicated upon mere attempts to influence the passage or enforcement of laws". Similarly, the Court wrote in Pennington that "[j]oint efforts to influence public officials do not violate the antitrust laws even though intended to eliminate competition." Finally, in California Motor Transport, the Court added that "the right to petition extends to all departments of the Government [and] [t]he right of access to the courts is indeed but one aspect of the right of petition."

Pursuant to this doctrine, immunity extends to attempts to petition all departments of the government. And "if . . . conduct constitutes valid petitioning, the petitioner is immune from antitrust liability whether or not the injuries are caused by the act of petitioning or are caused by government action which results from the petitioning."

== Doctrine ==
Under the Noerr–Pennington doctrine,"[a] party who petitions the government for redress generally is immune from antitrust liability." Petitioning is immune from liability even if there is an improper purpose or motive.

Noerr–Pennington immunity applies to actions which might otherwise violate the Sherman Act because "the federal antitrust laws do not regulate the conduct of private individuals in seeking anticompetitive action from the government." The antitrust laws are designed for the business world and "are not at all appropriate for application in the political arena." This was evident in Noerr, where defendant railroads campaigned for legislation intended to ruin the trucking industry. Even though defendants employed deceptive and unethical means, the Supreme Court held that they were still immune. This is because the Sherman Act is designed to control "business activity" and not "political activity." With this underpinning, the Court stated, "[Because] the right of petition is one of the freedoms protected by the Bill of Rights, . . . we cannot, of course, lightly impute to Congress an intent to invade these freedoms." The antitrust laws were enacted to regulate private business and do not abrogate the right to petition.

== Limited scope ==
The scope of Noerr–Pennington immunity, however, depends on the "source, context, and nature of the competitive restraint at issue."

- If the restraint directly results from private action there is no immunity. Passive government approval is insufficient. Private parties cannot immunize an anticompetitive agreement merely by subsequently requesting legislative approval.
- Private parties may be immunized against liability stemming from antitrust injuries flowing from valid petitioning. This includes two distinct types of actions.

1. A petitioner may be immune from the antitrust injuries which result from the petitioning itself.
2. Also, parties are immune from liability arising from the antitrust injuries caused by government action which results from the petitioning. Therefore, if its conduct constitutes valid petitioning, the petitioner is immune from antitrust liability whether or not the injuries are caused by the act of petitioning or are caused by government action which results from the petitioning.

== Expansion of the doctrine beyond the antitrust arena ==
Since its formulation, the doctrine has been extended to confer immunity from a variety of tort claims, including claims of unfair competition, tortious interference and abuse of process. The Ninth Circuit recently held that Noerr–Pennington also protects against RICO Act claims when a defendant has sent thousands of demand letters threatening suit.

== Exception for sham proceedings ==
There is a "sham" exception to the Noerr–Pennington doctrine which holds that using the petitioning process simply as an anticompetitive tool without legitimately seeking a positive outcome to the petitioning destroys immunity.

The Supreme Court has articulated a two-part test to determine the existence of "sham" litigation. First, such suits must be "objectively baseless in the sense that no reasonable litigant could realistically expect success on the merits." If that threshold is met, the court will inquire whether the suit demonstrates evidence of a subjective intent to use governmental process to interfere with a competitor's business.

For example, in California Motor Transport v. Trucking Unlimited, the United States Supreme Court held that the Noerr–Pennington doctrine did not apply where defendants had sought to intervene in licensing proceedings for competitors, because the intervention was not based on a good-faith effort to enforce the law, but was solely for the purpose of harassing those competitors and driving up their costs of doing business. The sine qua non of a "sham" proceeding is not the purpose to harm a competitor, but rather the absence of any purpose to actually obtain government action. Thus, initiating an administrative proceeding that one actually hopes to win in order to harm one's competitors is within the ambit of the Noerr–Pennington doctrine, while initiating a similar proceeding that one does not meaningfully intend to win solely to delay one's business competitors is within the sham exception.

In 1993, the Supreme Court rejected a purely subjective definition of a "sham" lawsuit, and set out a two-part test. Under the first prong of the test, a lawsuit fits within the "sham" exception to First Amendment immunity only if the lawsuit is objectively baseless in that "no reasonable litigant could realistically expect success on the merits." Only if the challenged litigation meets the first prong ("objectively baseless") may a court go on to the next prong, which consists of a determination of whether the litigant's subjective motivation in filing the objectively baseless lawsuit was an attempt to interfere with the business of a competitor.

== See also ==
- A.D. Bedell Wholesale Co., Inc. v. Philip Morris Inc. third circuit (2001) (reviews doctrine)
