= Right to petition in the United States =

Right in the First Amendment

The right to petition is protected by the First Amendment in the Bill of Rights.

In the United States, the right to petition is enumerated in the First Amendment to the United States Constitution, which specifically prohibits Congress from abridging "the right of the people peaceably to assemble, and to petition the Government for a redress of grievances".

Although often overlooked in favor of other more famous freedoms, and sometimes taken for granted, many other civil liberties are enforceable against the government only by exercising this basic right.

According to the Congressional Research Service, since the Constitution was written,

the right of petition has expanded. It is no longer confined to demands for “a redress of grievances,” in any accurate meaning of these words, but comprehends demands for an exercise by the government of its powers in furtherance of the interest and prosperity of the petitioners and of their views on politically contentious matters. The right extends to the "approach of citizens or groups of them to administrative agencies (which are both creatures of the legislature, and arms of the executive) and to courts, the third branch of Government. Certainly the right to petition extends to all departments of the Government. The right of access to the courts is indeed but one aspect of the right of petition."

== Historic roots ==
In Blackstone's Commentaries, Americans in the Thirteen Colonies read that "the right of petitioning the king, or either house of parliament, for the redress of grievances" was a "right appertaining to every individual".

In 1776, the Declaration of Independence cited King George's failure to redress the grievances listed in colonial petitions, such as the Olive Branch Petition of 1775, as a justification to declare independence:

In every stage of these Oppressions We have Petitioned for Redress in the most humble terms: Our repeated Petitions have been answered only by repeated injury. A Prince, whose character is thus marked by every act which may define a Tyrant, is unfit to be the ruler of a free people.

Historically, the right can be traced back to English documents such as Magna Carta, which, by its acceptance by the monarchy, implicitly affirmed the right. 14 Edw III Statute 1 Chapter 5 (1340) put petitioning on a formal statutory footing. It required that a Commission be provided at every Parliament to "hear by petition delivered to them, the Complaints of all those that will complain them of such Delays or Grievances done to them".

Then later, Article 5 Bill of Rights 1689, which explicitly declared "That it is the Right of the Subjects to petition the King and all Commitments and Prosecutions for such Petitioning are Illegall". "Redress of grievances", found in the petitioning clause of the US First Amendment is found in Article 13 of the 1689 Bill of Rights "And that for Redresse of all Grievances and for the amending strengthening and preserveing of the Lawes Parlyaments ought to be held frequently." indicating that the right to petition is cognate with the right to redress of grievance in Parliament. Similar clauses are found in Scotland's Petition of Rights.

Prince William of Orange (Future King William III) described in his Declaration of Reason the grievances that would result in the 1688 Bill of Rights. Regarding the right to petition he referenced the Trial of the Seven Bishops where the Lords Spiritual including the Arch Bishop of Canterbury were committed to the Tower and tried for Seditious Libel for refusing to obey orders to read a Declaration of Indulgence. They were tried and acquitted by jury. It was found that the Bishops could not be convicted of Seditious Libel because they were exercising a right to petition that was contained then within the 1661 Tumultuous Petitioning Act.

In reference to violation of the right to petition, the Prince of Orange had the following to say in his Declaration of Reason, "And yet it cannot be pretended, that any Kings, how great soever their Power has been, and how arbitrary and despotick soever they have been in the Exercise of it, have ever reckoned it a Crime for their Subjects to come, in all Submission and Respect, and in a due Number not exceeding the Limits of the Law, and represent to them the Reasons that made it impossible for them to obey their Orders." Reference here to numbers refers to limits to the number that could assemble to petition found in the 1661 Tumultuous Petitioning Act. The 1688 Bill of Rights provides no such limitation to assembly. Under the common law, the right of an individual to petition implies the right of multiple individuals to assemble lawfully for that purpose. England's implied right to assemble to petition was made an express right in the US First Amendment.

The Trial of the Seven Bishops also caused Art.1 Bill of Rights (1688), which declared that such suspension of a laws without consent of Parliament, regardless of "plausible pretext" is recognised as being illegal "That the pretended Power of Suspending of Laws or the Execution of Laws by Regall Authority without Consent of Parlyament is illegall." The Prince of Orange had the following to say about arbitrary rule (dictatorship) in his Declaration of Reason, "that the King can intirely suspend the Execution of those Laws relating to Treason or Felony, unless it is pretended, that he is cloathed with a despotick and arbitrary Power, and that the Lives, Liberties, Honours, and Estates of the Subjects, depend wholly on his goodwill and Pleasure, and are intirely subject to him; which must infallibly follow on the King's having a Power to suspend the Execution of Laws, and to dispense with them."

== History of floor petitions ==
Petitions are distinguished from memorials (statements from state legislatures requesting congressional action), communications (statements from federal agencies) and messages (statements between the president, Senate or House with each other).

=== United States Congress ===
Historically, floor petitions to Congress were addressed to a particular Member or to Congress as whole. Members of the House who received petitions would submit them to the Clerk of the House, followed by the Speaker and then to the committee with the most relevant jurisdiction. Petitions were usually read aloud on the floor by members of Congress and were written into the Congressional Record.

The right of petition was added to the First Amendment in the 1st United States Congress largely without comment. During the convention, on June 8, 1789, James Madison successfully submitted amendments which separated the clause for the rights of assembly, consultation, and petition from the clause containing the free expression guarantees of speech and the press. However, another proposed amendment for a "people's right to 'instruct their Representatives'" was defeated in votes in both the House and Senate, largely due to fears that such a right would undermine Congress' deliberative character and lead to irreconcilable factionalism. It was also the main means of political action allowed to African Americans (both free and enslaved), women and Native Americans prior to gaining the right to vote. The First Congress received over 621 petitions.

The first significant exercise and defense of the right to petition within the U.S. was to advocate the end of slavery by sending Congress well over a thousand petitions on the topic, signed by some 130,000 citizens. The American Anti-Slavery Society targeted most of the petitions to focused on slavery in the District of Columbia. Starting in 1836, the House of Representatives adopted a series of gag rules (notably the "Pinckney Gag Rule") that automatically tabled indefinitely all such anti-slavery petitions, and prohibited their discussion. The Senate took similar action. Former president John Quincy Adams and other Representatives eventually achieved repeal of these rules in 1844 on the basis that it was contrary to the Constitutional right (in the First Amendment) to "petition the government for the redress of grievances". Prior to the Civil War, other petitions concerned "contested election results, the National Bank, the expulsion of Cherokees from Georgia, land distribution, the abolition of dueling, government in the territories, the Alien and Sedition Acts, and the slave trade."

Petitions were also filed for financial relief from economic struggles, such as Thomas Hart Benton's petition requesting relief for victims of the Great Flood of 1951 (illustrated with lithographs of his own paintings depicting the flood's impact). Presentation of petitions were often accompanied by marches to the Capitol, including Coxey's Army (1894) and the Bonus Army (1932).

The period from the end of the Civil War to World War I saw the highest per capita volume of floor petitions, peaking with 16,206 petitions in the 52nd Congress. Floor petitions remained in frequent use until 1946, with the passage of the Administrative Procedure Act and the Legislative Reorganization Act, which largely reorganized federal agencies to be the primary recipients of public comments over rules, regulations and tort. Since 1946, the number of floor petitions has drastically declined and are rarely submitted.

In 2020, a Congressional Petitions Database (CPD) was established to document over 537,000 floor petitions to Congress filed from 1789 to 1949. Over 9,000 of these petitions were extracted from the database for The Amend Project, a database tracking the history of proposed amendments to the constitution from 1789 to 2022.

=== State legislatures ===
The right to petition is included in 48 state constitutions, except for Minnesota and New Mexico. The right to petition is considered fundamental to those states which allow for ballot initiatives and veto referendums.

== Scope ==
While the prohibition of abridgment of the right to petition originally referred only to the federal legislature (the Congress) and courts, the incorporation doctrine later expanded the protection of the right to its current scope, over all state and federal courts and legislatures and the executive branches of the state and federal governments. The right to petition includes under its umbrella the legal right to sue the government. Civil litigation between two private individuals or entities is considered to be a right to a peititon, since they are asking the government's court system to remedy their problems.

Some define lobbying as any kind of persuading of a public official and say that petitioning includes it. Others say the petition clause gives no right to lobby. Lobbying includes approaching a public official in secret, possibly giving them money. But petitioning, as America's founders knew it, was a public process, involving no money.

Some litigants have contended that the right to petition the government includes a requirement that the government listen to or respond to members of the public. This view was rejected by the United States Supreme Court in 1984:

Nothing in the First Amendment or in this Court's case law interpreting it suggests that the rights to speak, associate, and petition require government policymakers to listen or respond to communications of members of the public on public issues.

See also Smith v. Arkansas State Highway Employees, where the U.S. Supreme Court ruled that the Arkansas State Highway Commission's refusal to consider employee grievances when filed by the union, rather than directly by an employee of the State Highway Department, did not violate the First Amendment to the United States Constitution.

The Supreme Court has largely interpreted the Petition Clause as coextensive with the Free Speech Clause of the First Amendment, but in its 2010 decision in Borough of Duryea v. Guarnieri (2010) it acknowledged that there may be differences between the two:

This case arises under the Petition Clause, not the Speech Clause. The parties litigated the case on the premise that Guarnieri's grievances and lawsuit are petitions protected by the Petition Clause. This Court's precedents confirm that the Petition Clause protects the right of individuals to appeal to courts and other forums established by the government for resolution of legal disputes. ... Although this case proceeds under the Petition Clause, Guarnieri just as easily could have alleged that his employer retaliated against him for the speech contained within his grievances and lawsuit. ... The question presented by this case is whether the history and purpose of the Petition Clause justify the imposition of broader liability when an employee invokes its protection instead of the protection afforded by the Speech Clause.

It is not necessary to say that the two Clauses are identical in their mandate or their purpose and effect to acknowledge that the rights of speech and petition share substantial common ground. This Court has said that the right to speak and the right to petition are "cognate rights." Thomas v. Collins, 323 U. S. 516, 530 (1945); see also Wayte v. United States, 470 U. S. 598, 610, n. 11 (1985). "It was not by accident or coincidence that the rights to freedom in speech and press were coupled in a single guaranty with the rights of the people peaceably to assemble and to petition for redress of grievances." Thomas, 323 U. S., at 530. Both speech and petition are integral to the democratic process, although not necessarily in the same way. The right to petition allows citizens to express their ideas, hopes, and concerns to their government and their elected representatives, whereas the right to speak fosters the public exchange of ideas that is integral to deliberative democracy as well as to the whole realm of ideas and human affairs. Beyond the political sphere, both speech and petition advance personal expression, although the right to petition is generally concerned with expression directed to the government seeking redress of a grievance.

Courts should not presume there is always an essential equivalence in the two Clauses or that Speech Clause precedents necessarily and in every case resolve Petition Clause claims. See ibid. (rights of speech and petition are "not identical"). Interpretation of the Petition Clause must be guided by the objectives and aspirations that underlie the right. A petition conveys the special concerns of its author to the government and, in its usual form, requests action by the government to address those concerns. See [Sure-Tan Inc. v. NLRB, 467 U. S. 883, 896–897 (1984)].

This Court’s opinion in McDonald v. Smith, 472 U. S. 479 (1985), has sometimes been interpreted to mean that the right to petition can extend no further than the right to speak; but McDonald held only that speech contained within a petition is subject to the same standards for defamation and libel as speech outside a petition. In those circumstances the Court found "no sound basis for granting greater constitutional protection to statements made in a petition … than other First Amendment expressions." Id., at 485. There may arise cases where the special concerns of the Petition Clause would provide a sound basis for a distinct analysis; and if that is so, the rules and principles that define the two rights might differ in emphasis and formulation.

— 564 U.S. at 387-389

=== Restrictions ===
The law of South Dakota prohibits sex offenders from circulating petitions, carrying a maximum potential sentence of one year in jail and a $2,000 fine.

Circulation of a petition by a prisoner in Federal Bureau of Prisons (BOP) is a prohibited act under 28 CFR 541.3, and is punishable by solitary confinement.

The term "Petition" as used in both of these regulations is restricted to those petitions which are directed at the executive or legislative branches of government, and does not include documents filed in a court of law, which are also referred to as "petitions", such as petitions for coram nobis, mandamus, habeas corpus, prohibition, and certiorari, among others. While these are commonly referred to as a "petition" they are forms of civil action against the government that may result in the courts issuing a writ directing the government to act, or refrain from acting, in a specified manner.

The right of government employees to address grievances with their employer over work-related matters can be restricted to administrative processes under Supreme Court precedent. In Pickering v. Board of Education, the Supreme Court decided that the court must balance the employee's right to engage in speech against the government's interest in being efficient and effective in the public services it performs. Later Supreme Court precedent—Connick v. Myers, Garcetti v. Ceballos, and Borough of Duryea v. Guarnieri—has established that public employees must show they spoke as a citizen on a matter of public concern when suing their employer under the First Amendment's Speech or Petition Clauses.

== See also ==
- We the People (petitioning system)
