= 2026 United States Senate election in Colorado =

- November 3, 2026
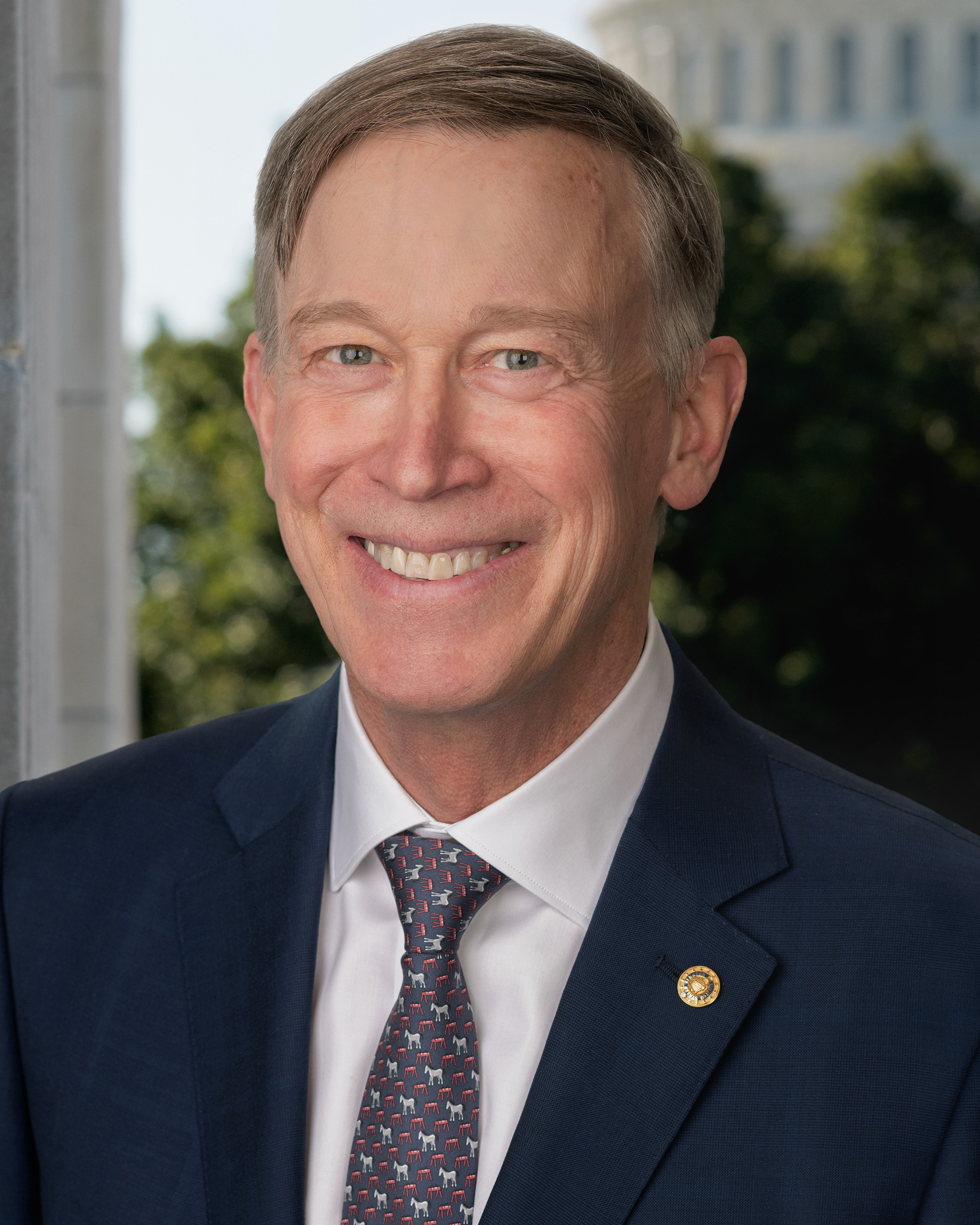

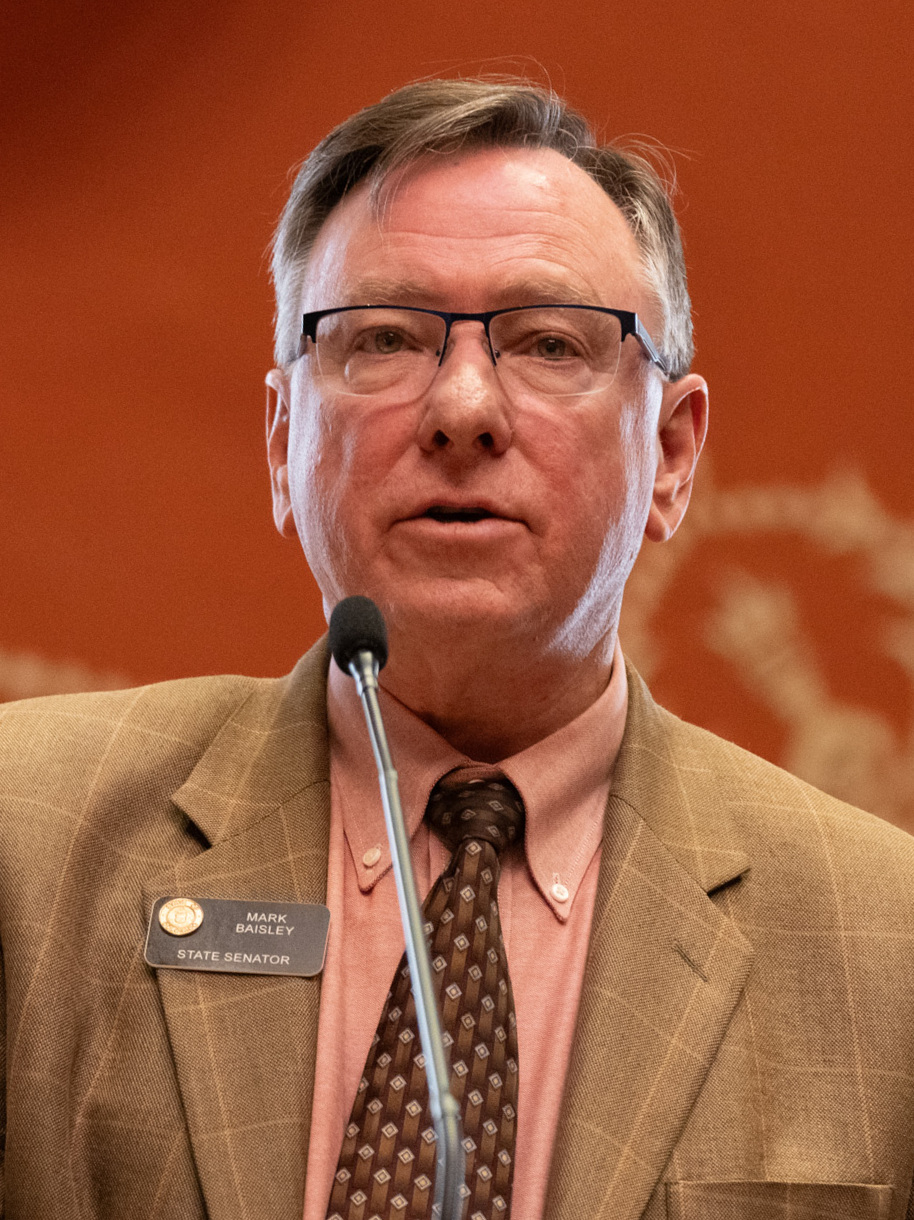
Nominee	John Hickenlooper	Mark Baisley
Party	Democratic	Republican
Popular vote	1,629,521	942,095
Percentage	60.50%	34.98%
- Hickenlooper: 40–50% 50–60% 60–70% 70–80% 80–90% Baisley: 40–50% 50–60% 60–70% 70–80% 80–90%
U.S. senator before election
John Hickenlooper
Democratic
Elected U.S. Senator
John Hickenlooper
Democratic

The 2026 United States Senate election in Colorado was held on November 3, 2026, to elect a member of the United States Senate to represent the state of Colorado. Democratic incumbent John Hickenlooper was re-elected a second term, defeating Republican state senator Mark Baisley.

Primary elections were held on June 30. In the Democratic primary, Hickenlooper won the nomination with 52.8% of the vote over state senator Julie Gonzales. Baisley was the only candidate to receive at least 30% support from the Republican State Assembly, allowing him to advance to the primary unopposed.

== Background ==
While Colorado was once considered a swing state, it has shifted significantly to the left over the past decade and is now regarded as solidly Democratic at both the federal and state levels. Democrats have held all statewide offices, both U.S. Senate seats, and strong majorities in both chambers of the Colorado General Assembly, while the state's U.S. House delegation was evenly split. In 2014, Republican Cory Gardner narrowly defeated Democratic incumbent Mark Udall for the U.S. Senate. As the state continued trending Democratic, Gardner—then the only Republican holding major statewide office—lost his 2020 re-election bid to Democrat John Hickenlooper by a significant margin. In late 2024, Hickenlooper announced he would seek re-election but indicated that the campaign would be his final run for the Senate.

== Democratic primary ==
=== Candidates ===
To move forward to the primary, candidates had to petition onto the ballot or achieve 30% or more at the Colorado Democratic Party State Assembly. John Hickenlooper was the only candidate to petition onto the primary ballot. All other candidates went through the State Assembly process. Julie Gonzales was the only candidate to achieve 30% or more.

==== Nominee ====
- John Hickenlooper, incumbent U.S. senator

==== Eliminated in primary ====
- Julie Gonzales, state senator from the 34th district (2019–present)

==== Eliminated at convention ====
- Karen Breslin, college professor, candidate for U.S. Senate in 2022, and candidate for Colorado's 4th congressional district in 2024
- Jessica Williams

==== Withdrawn ====
- Brashad Hasley, software engineer
- Nichole Miner, college student
- A.J. Zimpfer, accountant

=== Endorsements ===
Julie Gonzales

State legislators

- Polly Baca, former SD-25 (1979–1987)
- Joan Fitz-Gerald, former SD-16 (2001–2007)
- Robert Rodriguez, Senate majority leader (2023–present) from SD-32 (2019–present)

Labor unions

- Colorado AFL-CIO
- Colorado State Association of Letter Carriers
- Communication Workers of America
- SEIU Colorado
- UFCW Local 7

Organizations

- Center for Biological Diversity Action Fund
- Gen Z for Change
- Indivisible
- Jane Fonda Climate PAC
- Our Revolution
- Peace Action
- Progressive Victory
- Sunrise Movement Denver
- Third Act Colorado
- Track AIPAC (co-endorsement with Breslin)

Political parties

- Colorado Working Families Party
John Hickenlooper

Executive branch officials

- Ken Salazar, former ambassador to Mexico (2021–2025)

U.S. senators

- Michael Bennet, Colorado (2009–present)
- Elizabeth Warren, Massachusetts (2013–present)

U.S. representatives

- John Salazar, former CO-03 (2005–2011)

Labor unions

- American Federation of State, County and Municipal Employees
- Colorado Professional Fire Fighters
- SMART Local 9
- UA Pipefitters Union Local 208
- Western States Regional Council of Carpenters

Organizations

- 314 Action
- AIPAC
- Brady Campaign
- Center for New Liberalism
- End Citizens United
- Giffords
- J Street
- Jewish Democratic Council of America
- Joint Action Committee for Political Affairs
- League of Conservation Voters Action Fund
- Natural Resources Defense Council
- Planned Parenthood Action Fund
- Population Connection
- Reproductive Freedom for All
Karen Breslin (eliminated at convention)

Organizations

- Our Revolution Denver
- Track AIPAC (co-endorsement with Gonzales)
Declined to endorse

Newspapers

- The Denver Post

=== Fundraising ===
Italics indicate a withdrawn candidate.

Campaign finance reports as of June 10, 2026
Candidate	Raised	Spent	Cash on hand
Julie Gonzales (D)	$869,056	$642,852	$226,205
John Hickenlooper (D)	$9,884,305	$8,561,826	$2,964,562
Source: Federal Election Commission

=== Polling ===
Poll source	Date(s) administered	Sample size (Note: Key: A – all adults RV – registered voters LV – likely voters V – unclear)	Margin of error	Julie Gonzales	John Hickenlooper	Other	Undecided
Colorado Community Research	May 17–28, 2026	796 (LV)	± 4.0%	34%	41%	–	25%
Data for Progress (D) (Note: Poll sponsored by the Working Families Party, which has endorsed Gonzales.)	February 20–25, 2026	739 (LV)	± 4.0%	13%	45%	4% (Note: Breslin with 3%, Zimpfer with 1% and Hasley with 0%)	37%

=== Results ===
Primary election results by county: Hickenlooper: 50–60%; 60–70%; 70–80%; Gonzales: 50–60%

Democratic primary results
Party	Candidate	Votes	%
Democratic	John Hickenlooper (incumbent)	472,870	52.8
Democratic	Julie Gonzales	422,488	47.2
Total votes		895,358	100.0

== Republican primary ==
=== Candidates ===
To move forward to the primary, candidates had to petition onto the ballot or achieve 30% or more at the Colorado Republican Party State Assembly. None of the candidates petitioned onto the primary ballot. All candidates went through the State Assembly process. Mark Baisley was the only candidate to achieve 30% or more.

==== Nominee ====
- Mark Baisley, state senator from the 4th district (2023–present) (previously ran for governor)

==== Eliminated at convention ====
- Amanda Calderon, business owner
- Janak Joshi, former state representative from the 16th district (2011–2017) and candidate for Colorado's 8th congressional district in 2024
- George Markert, AI strategic advisor (running for lieutenant governor)
- Sean Pond, Montrose County commissioner

==== Declined ====
- Brandi Bradley, state representative from the 39th district (2023–present)

=== Endorsements ===
Janak Joshi

U.S. representatives

- Bob Schaffer, former CO-04 (1997–2003)
George Markert

U.S. representatives

- Tom Tancredo, former CO-06 (1999–2009)

=== Fundraising ===
Campaign finance reports as of June 10, 2026
Candidate	Raised	Spent	Cash on hand
Mark Baisley (R)	$77,147	$65,702	$11,445
Source: Federal Election Commission

=== Results ===
Republican primary results
Party	Candidate	Votes	%
Republican	Mark Baisley	445,352	100.0
Total votes		445,352	100.0

== Independent candidates ==
=== Candidates ===
==== Declared ====
- Christopher Baum (Approval Voting)
- Bob Chew (Forward)
- Blake Huber (Libertarian)
- Adam Withrow (Unity)

==== Withdrawn ====
- Clinton Roosevelt Dale
- Joshua William Kuebler

== General election ==
=== Predictions ===
Source	Ranking	As of
The Cook Political Report	Solid D	November 2, 2026
Decision Desk HQ	Safe D	November 3, 2026
The Economist (Note: The Economist's prediction model uses unconventional terminology. For the purpose of equivalency, their "Very Likely" ratings are formatted as a "Likely" rating while "Likely" ratings are formatted as a "Lean" rating.)	Safe D	November 3, 2026
FiftyPlusOne	Safe D	November 3, 2026
Fox News	Solid D	November 1, 2026
Inside Elections	Solid D	October 29, 2026
MS NOW	Safe D	October 29, 2026
NBC News	Solid D	November 3, 2026
RealClearPolitics	Solid D	November 2, 2026
Sabato's Crystal Ball	Safe D	November 2, 2026
Silver Bulletin	Solid D	November 3, 2026
Split Ticket	Safe D	November 2, 2026

=== Post-primary endorsements ===
John Hickenlooper (D)

Labor unions

- National Education Association

=== Fundraising ===
Campaign finance reports as of October 14, 2026
Candidate	Raised	Spent	Cash on hand
John Hickenlooper (D)	$11,695,273	$11,778,528	$1,558,828
Mark Baisley (R)	$138,210	$110,837	$27,710
Bob Chew (FWD)	$3,603,854	$3,368,847	$235,007
Source: Federal Election Commission

=== Polling ===
Aggregate polls

Source of poll aggregation	Dates administered	Dates updated	John Hickenlooper (D)	Mark Baisley (R)	Other/ Undecided (Note: Calculated by taking the difference of 100% and all other candidates combined.)	Margin
270toWin	October 9 – November 2, 2026	November 2, 2026	59.0%	38.0%	3.0%	Hickenlooper +21.0%
Silver Bulletin	through November 2, 2026	November 3, 2026	57.1%	37.5%	5.4%	Hickenlooper +19.6%
Average			58.1%	37.8%	4.1%	Hickenlooper +20.3%

Poll source	Date(s) administered	Sample size	Margin of error	John Hickenlooper (D)	Mark Baisley (R)	Other	Undecided
Keating Research (D)	November 1–2, 2026	400 (LV)	± 4.9%	58%	37%	3% (Note: "Other candidate" with 3%)	2%
Research Co.	October 31 – November 2, 2026	450 (LV)	± 4.6%	57%	35%	2% (Note: "Some other candidate" with 2%)	6%
CU Boulder/YouGov	October 9–20, 2026	710 (LV)	± 4.5%	57%	39%	4% (Note: "I would not vote" with 3%; "Other" with 1%)	—
Lake Research Partners (D) (Note: Poll sponsored by the Ballot Initiative Strategy Center.)	September 16–30, 2026	600 (RV)	—	52%	38%	1%	8%

=== Results ===
2026 United States Senate election in Colorado
Party	Candidate	Votes	%	±%
Democratic	John Hickenlooper (incumbent)	1,629,521	60.50	+7.00
Republican	Mark Baisley	942,095	34.98	−9.20
Forward	Bob Chew	70,794	2.63	N/A
Libertarian	Blake Huber	33,136	1.23	−0.51
Unity	Adam Withrow	13,717	0.51	+0.23
Approval Voting	Christopher Baum	4,268	0.16	−0.14
Write-in				N/A
Total votes		2,693,531	100.0	N/A
Democratic hold				

Counties that flipped from Republican to Democratic

- Alamosa (largest municipality: Alamosa)
- Douglas (largest municipality: Castle Rock)
- El Paso (largest municipality: Colorado Springs)
- Garfield (largest municipality: Rifle)
- Grand (largest municipality: Granby)
- Huerfano (largest municipality: Walsenburg)
- Las Animas (largest municipality: Trinidad)

== Notes ==
Partisan clients

== See also ==
- 2026 Colorado gubernatorial election
- 2026 Colorado elections
