= Mattingly =

Mattingly may refer to:

== Surname ==
The Mattingly surname originated in Mattingley, Hampshire, England, where said family lived for over 600 years.

- David Mattingly (disambiguation), multiple people
  - David Burroughs Mattingly (born 1956), American illustrator
  - David Mattingly (archaeologist) (born 1958), British historian and author
- Don Mattingly (born 1961), American baseball player and coach
- Earl Mattingly (1904–1993), American baseball player
- Garrett Mattingly (1900–1962), American historian
- Harold Mattingly (1884–1964), British historian
- Ignatius Mattingly (1927–2004), American linguist
- Jimmy Mattingly is a fictional character in the movie That Thing You Do!
- Ken Mattingly (1936–2023), American astronaut
- Lenora Mattingly Weber (1895–1971), American author
- Mack Mattingly (born 1931), American politician
- Marie Mattingly Meloney (1878–1943), American reporter, magazine editor, and socialite
- Mary Mattingly (born 1978), American artist
- Mildred Mattingly (1927–2021), American teacher and state legislator
- Nace Mattingly (1921–2000), former NASCAR Cup Series driver
- Phil Mattingly (born 1986), American journalist
- Preston Mattingly (born 1987), American baseball executive
- Randy Mattingly (born 1951), American gridiron football player
- Sylvan Mattingly (1882–1951), American Roman Catholic teacher
- Terry Mattingly (born 1954), American author

== Places ==
- Mattingly, Kentucky, United States
- Mattingly Settlement, Ohio, United States

== See also ==
- Mattingley, a village and civil parish in Hampshire, England
