= 2010 United States Senate election in Colorado =

- November 2, 2010
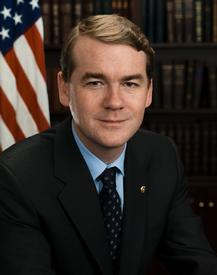

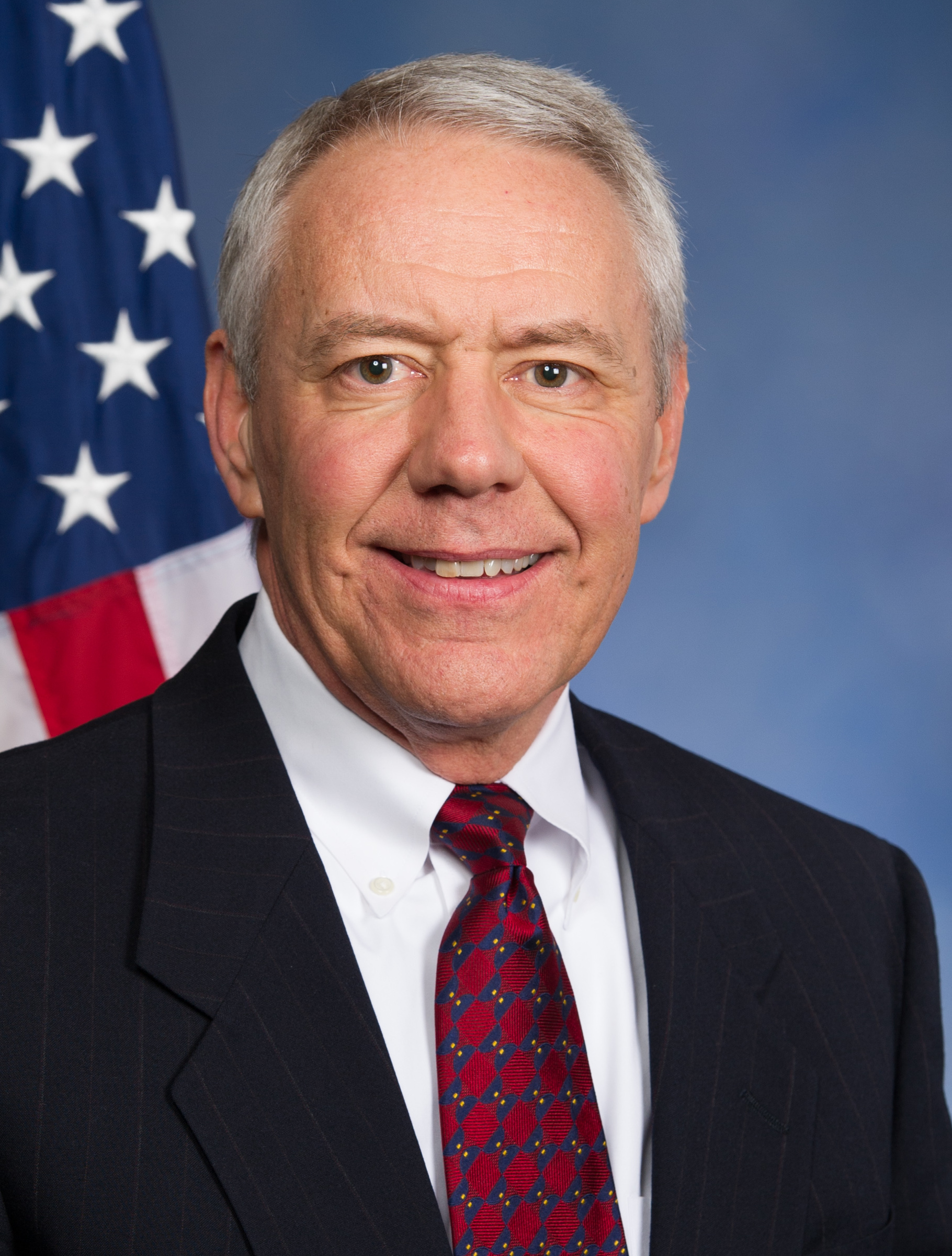
Nominee	Michael Bennet	Ken Buck
Party	Democratic	Republican
Popular vote	854,685	824,789
Percentage	48.08%	46.40%
- Bennet: 40–50% 50–60% 60–70% 70–80% 80–90% >90% Buck: 40–50% 50–60% 60–70% 70–80% 80–90% >90% Tie: 40–50% No votes
U.S. senator before election
Michael Bennet (Note: In January 2009, Bennet was appointed by Governor Bill Ritter to fill the vacancy caused by the resignation of Senator Ken Salazar, who had been appointed Secretary of the Interior.)
Democratic
Elected U.S. Senator
Michael Bennet
Democratic

The 2010 United States Senate election in Colorado took place on November 2, 2010, alongside other elections to the United States Senate in other states as well as elections to the United States House of Representatives and various state and local elections. In December 2008, President-elect Barack Obama nominated incumbent U.S. Senator Ken Salazar as Secretary of the Interior. After Salazar resigned from his seat, Democratic governor Bill Ritter appointed Denver Public Schools Superintendent Michael Bennet to fill the seat.

Bennet won a full term, defeating former state House speaker Andrew Romanoff in the Democratic primary, and Republican nominee Ken Buck in the general election. With a margin of 1.7%, this election was the second-closest race of the 2010 Senate election cycle after the concurrent one in Illinois.

== Democratic primary ==
=== Candidates ===
==== Nominee ====
- Michael Bennet, incumbent U.S. senator

==== Eliminated in primary ====
- Andrew Romanoff, former speaker of the Colorado House of Representatives

=== Endorsements ===
Michael Bennet

Executive branch officials

- Barack Obama, President of the United States (2009-2017)

U.S. senators

- Russ Feingold, Wisconsin (1993-2011)
- Gary Hart, former Colorado (1975-1987)
- Mark Udall, Colorado (2009-2015)

U.S. representatives

- Diana DeGette, CO-01 (1997-2027)
- Betsy Markey, CO-04 (2009-2011)
- Ed Perlmutter, CO-07 (2007-2023)
- Jared Polis, CO-02 (2009-2019)
- John Salazar, CO-03 (2005-2011)

Statewide officials

- Bill Ritter, governor of Colorado (2007-2011)
Andrew Romanoff

Executive branch officials

- Bill Clinton, former president of the United States (1993-2001)

=== Polling ===
Poll source	Dates administered	Michael Bennet	Andrew Romanoff	Undecided
The Tarrance Group	September 16–17, 2009	41%	27%	32%
Public Policy Polling	May 19, 2010	46%	31%	23%
Survey USA	June 15–17, 2010	53%	36%	11%
Survey USA	August 1, 2010	45%	48%	7%
Public Policy Polling	August 7–8, 2010	49%	43%	9%

=== Results ===
Results by county: Bennet: 50–60%; 60–70%; 70–80%; 80–90%; Romanoff: 50–60%

Democratic primary results
Party	Candidate	Votes	%
Democratic	Michael Bennet (incumbent)	184,714	54.15%
Democratic	Andrew Romanoff	156,419	45.85%
Total votes		341,133	100.0%

== Republican primary ==
=== Candidates ===
==== Nominee ====
- Ken Buck, Weld County district attorney

==== Eliminated in primary ====
- Jane Norton, former lieutenant governor of Colorado

==== Eliminated in convention ====
- Steve Barton
- Robert Greenheck
- Cleve Tidwell, businessman

==== Withdrew ====
- Tom Wiens, former state senator

==== Declined ====
- Bob Beauprez, former U.S. representative for Colorado's 7th congressional district
- Troy Eid, U.S. attorney for United States District Court for the District of Colorado
- Ryan Frazier, Aurora city councilman

=== Endorsements ===
Ken Buck

U.S. senators

- Jim DeMint, South Carolina (2005-2013)

State legislators

- Tom Wiens, former SD-04 (2005-2009)

Individuals

- Erick Erickson, blogger
Jane Norton

U.S. senators

- Wayne Allard, former Colorado (1997-2009)
- William L. Armstrong, former Colorado (1979-1991)
- Hank Brown, former Colorado (1991-1997)
- Sam Brownback, Kansas (1996-2011)
- Tom Coburn, Oklahoma (2005-2015)
- Orrin Hatch, Utah (1977-2019)

U.S. representatives

- Bob Beauprez, former CO-07 (2003-2007)

Statewide officials

- Jan Brewer, governor of Arizona (2009-2015)
- Mark Hillman, former Colorado State Treasurer (2005-2006)
- Bill Owens, former governor of Colorado (1999-2007)
- Sarah Palin, former governor of Alaska (2006-2009)
- John Suthers, Colorado Attorney General (2005-2015)

State legislators

- Josh Penry, SD-07 (2007-2011)

Organizations

- American Conservative Union
- Family Research Council
- Susan B. Anthony List
- United States Chamber of Commerce

=== Polling ===
Poll source	Dates administered	Ken Buck	Jane Norton
The Tarrance Group	September 16–17, 2009	15%	45%
Public Policy Polling	March 3, 2010	17%	34%
Magellan	March 14, 2010	13%	41%
Magellan	April 19, 2010	32%	29%
Public Policy Polling	May 19, 2010	26%	31%
Magellan	June 8, 2010	42%	32%
Survey USA	June 15–17, 2010	53%	37%
Public Opinion Strategies	June 20–21, 2010	33%	39%
Survey USA	August 1, 2010	50%	41%
Public Policy Polling	August 7–8, 2010	43%	45%

=== Results ===
Results by county: Buck: 50–60%; 60–70%; 70–80%; Norton: 50–60%; 60–70%; Tie: 50%

Republican primary results
Party	Candidate	Votes	%
Republican	Ken Buck	211,099	51.57%
Republican	Jane Norton	198,231	48.43%
Total votes		409,330	100.0%

== Libertarian primary ==
=== Candidates ===
==== Nominee ====
- Mac Stringer

==== Eliminated in primary ====
- John Finger

=== Results ===
Libertarian primary results
Party	Candidate	Votes	%
Libertarian	Mac Stringer	1,186	52.45%
Libertarian	John Finger	1,075	47.55%
Total votes		2,261	100.0%

== General election ==
=== Candidates ===
==== Major ====
- Michael Bennet (D), incumbent U.S. senator
- Ken Buck (R), Weld County DA

==== Minor ====
- Bob Kinsey (G)
- Bruce E. Lohmiller (G) (write-in)
- Charley Miller (I)
- J. Moromisato (I)
- Jason Napolitano (I)
- Michele M. Newman (I) (write-in)
- Robert Rank (R) (write-in)
- Mac Stringer (L)

=== Campaign ===
This was one of the most expensive elections in the nation, as more than $30 million was spent by outside organizations. Conservative third-party groups hammered Bennet for voting 92% of the time with the Democratic leadership, including voting for healthcare reform and the stimulus package. Liberal third-party groups called Buck extremist. Bennet focused on attacking Buck's views on abortion, which he believed should be banned, including in cases of rape and incest. He was also attacked for wanting to eliminate the Seventeenth Amendment and refusing to prosecute an alleged rapist as Weld County district attorney. Planned Parenthood mounted a mail campaign, targeting women voters with the warning "Colorado women can't trust Ken Buck." Bennet won the women vote by 17 points according to exit polls. After the election, Buck conceded to the Denver Post that the main reason he lost was social issues.

=== Debates ===
- September 12: Sponsored by Club 20 in Grand Junction

=== Predictions ===
Source	Ranking	As of
Cook Political Report	Tossup	October 26, 2010
Inside Elections	Tossup	October 22, 2010
RealClearPolitics	Tossup	October 26, 2010
Sabato's Crystal Ball	Lean R (flip)	October 21, 2010
CQ Politics	Tossup	October 26, 2010

=== Polling ===
Poll source	Date(s) administered	Michael Bennet (D)	Ken Buck (R)
Public Policy Polling	April 17–19, 2009	40%	39%
Public Policy Polling	August 14–16, 2009	39%	35%
Rasmussen Reports	September 9, 2009	43%	37%
Rasmussen Reports	December 8, 2009	38%	42%
Daily Kos/Research 2000	January 11–13, 2010	41%	38%
Rasmussen Reports	January 13, 2010	38%	43%
Rasmussen Reports	February 2, 2010	41%	45%
Rasmussen Reports	March 2, 2010	38%	44%
Public Policy Polling	March 5–8, 2010	47%	40%
Rasmussen Reports	April 5, 2010	40%	44%
Rasmussen Reports	May 3, 2010	41%	48%
Public Policy Polling	May 19, 2010	45%	39%
Rasmussen Reports	June 7, 2010	41%	46%
Survey USA	June 15–17, 2010	43%	46%
Rasmussen Reports	July 8, 2010	39%	48%
Rasmussen Reports	July 26, 2010	42%	48%
Survey USA	August 1, 2010	43%	43%
Public Policy Polling	August 10, 2010	46%	43%
Rasmussen Reports	August 11, 2010	41%	46%
Ipsos/Reuters	August 20–22, 2010	40%	49%
Rasmussen Reports	August 30, 2010	44%	47%
Rasmussen Reports	September 14, 2010	45%	49%
CNN/Time	September 17–21, 2010	44%	49%
Rasmussen Reports	September 27, 2010	43%	51%
Rasmussen Reports	September 27, 2010	43%	51%
McClatchy/Marist	September 26–28, 2010	42%	50%
Survey USA	September 28–30, 2010	43%	48%
Public Policy Polling	September 30 – October 2, 2010	46%	45%
Rasmussen Reports	October 14, 2010	45%	47%
Fox News/Pulse Opinion Research	October 16, 2010	45%	46%
Ipsos/Reuters	October 18, 2010	45%	48%
SurveyUSA	October 19–21, 2010	47%	47%
Public Policy Polling	October 21–23, 2010	47%	47%
Rasmussen Reports	October 25, 2010	44%	48%
CNN/Time/Opinion Research	October 20–26, 2010	46%	47%
Marist College	October 26–28, 2010	45%	49%
Fox News/Pulse Opinion Research	October 30, 2010	46%	50%
Public Policy Polling	October 30–31, 2010	48%	49%

=== Fundraising ===
These totals reflect the campaign accounts of the candidates themselves, and do not include independent expenditures by other groups.

Candidate (party)	Receipts	Disbursements	Cash on hand	Debt
Michael Bennet (D)	$11,463,661	$10,698,578	$763,541	$887,692
Ken Buck (R)	$3,827,432	$3,011,656	$1,039,994	$100,000
Source: Federal Election Commission

=== Results ===
United States Senate election in Colorado, 2010
Party	Candidate	Votes	%	±%
Democratic	Michael Bennet (incumbent)	854,685	48.08%	−3.22%
Republican	Ken Buck	824,789	46.40%	−0.13%
Green	Bob Kinsey	38,884	2.19%	N/A
Libertarian	Maclyn Stringer	22,646	1.27%	+0.79%
Independent	Jason Napolitano	19,450	1.09%	N/A
Independent	Charley Miller	11,351	0.64%	N/A
Independent	J. Moromisato	5,780	0.33%	N/A
Write-in		83	0.07%	N/A
Total votes		1,777,668	100.0%	
Democratic hold				

==== By county ====
County	Michael Bennet Democratic		Ken Buck Republican		Various candidates Other parties		Margin		Total votes cast
County	#	%	#	%	#	%	#	%	Total votes cast
Adams	55,601	50.05%	47,446	42.71%	8,042	7.24%	8,155	7.34%	111,081
Alamosa	2,656	54.00%	1,977	40.19%	285	5.79%	679	13.81%	4,918
Arapahoe	97,240	49.51%	88,957	45.29%	10,177	5.20%	8,283	4.22%	196,374
Archuleta	1,952	37.95%	2,875	55.90%	316	6.15%	-923	-17.95%	5,143
Baca	548	28.40%	1,248	64.69%	133	6.91%	-700	-36.29%	1,929
Bent	652	41.13%	811	51.16%	122	7.71%	-159	-10.03%	1,585
Boulder	84,264	67.26%	35,450	28.30%	5,551	4.44%	48,814	38.96%	125,265
Broomfield	11,034	48.73%	10,382	45.85%	1,227	5.42%	652	2.88%	22,643
Chaffee	3,936	46.99%	3,892	46.46%	548	6.55%	44	0.53%	8,376
Cheyenne	187	19.83%	696	73.80%	60	6.37%	-509	-53.97%	943
Clear Creek	2,385	52.29%	1,876	41.13%	300	6.58%	509	11.16%	4,561
Conejos	1,625	52.96%	1,312	42.76%	131	4.28%	313	10.20%	3,068
Costilla	1,004	69.38%	348	24.04%	95	6.58%	656	45.34%	1,447
Crowley	474	36.48%	717	55.19%	108	8.33%	-243	-18.71%	1,299
Custer	680	29.90%	1,453	63.89%	141	6.21%	-773	-33.99%	2,274
Delta	3,932	30.28%	8,025	61.80%	1,028	7.92%	-4,093	-31.52%	12,985
Denver	135,793	71.42%	46,148	24.27%	8,176	4.31%	89,645	47.15%	190,117
Dolores	334	33.83%	576	58.35%	77	7.82%	-242	-24.52%	987
Douglas	41,013	35.40%	69,971	60.40%	4,850	4.20%	-28,958	-25.00%	115,834
Eagle	7,707	53.05%	5,998	41.29%	821	5.66%	1,709	11.76%	14,526
El Paso	66,162	34.13%	116,803	60.26%	10,852	5.61%	-50,641	-26.13%	193,817
Elbert	2,647	24.37%	7,573	69.72%	641	5.91%	-4,926	-45.35%	10,861
Fremont	5,185	32.66%	9,334	58.80%	1,353	8.54%	-4,149	-26.14%	15,872
Garfield	8,062	45.36%	8,423	47.39%	1,286	7.25%	-361	-2.03%	17,771
Gilpin	1,358	51.07%	1,100	41.36%	201	7.57%	258	9.71%	2,659
Grand	2,795	43.15%	3,257	50.28%	425	6.57%	-462	-7.13%	6,477
Gunnison	3,435	54.87%	2,377	37.97%	448	7.16%	1,058	16.90%	6,260
Hinsdale	225	39.26%	314	54.79%	34	5.95%	-89	-15.53%	573
Huerfano	1,530	52.57%	1,205	41.40%	175	6.03%	325	11.17%	2,910
Jackson	218	29.94%	433	59.47%	77	10.59%	-215	-29.53%	728
Jefferson	108,954	48.37%	103,657	46.01%	12,636	5.62%	5,297	2.36%	225,247
Kiowa	181	23.94%	532	70.37%	43	5.69%	-351	-46.43%	756
Kit Carson	740	25.16%	2,012	68.41%	189	6.43%	-1,272	-43.25%	2,941
La Plata	10,327	50.39%	9,301	45.38%	865	4.23%	1,026	5.01%	20,493
Lake	1,208	55.79%	790	36.48%	167	7.73%	418	19.31%	2,165
Larimer	59,456	48.07%	56,954	46.05%	7,266	5.88%	2,502	2.02%	123,676
Las Animas	2,842	51.99%	2,286	41.82%	338	6.19%	556	10.17%	5,466
Lincoln	482	26.15%	1,234	66.95%	127	6.90%	-752	-40.80%	1,843
Logan	2,390	32.20%	4,483	60.40%	549	7.40%	-2,093	-28.20%	7,422
Mesa	17,522	32.14%	32,971	60.48%	4,017	7.38%	-15,449	-28.34%	54,510
Mineral	247	43.33%	270	47.36%	53	9.31%	-23	-4.03%	570
Moffat	1,104	24.23%	3,080	67.60%	372	8.17%	-1,976	-43.37%	4,556
Montezuma	3,349	35.02%	5,648	59.07%	564	5.91%	-2,229	-24.05%	9,561
Montrose	4,627	29.38%	9,885	62.76%	1,236	7.86%	-5,258	-33.38%	15,748
Morgan	2,847	35.15%	4,732	58.42%	520	6.43%	-1,885	-23.27%	8,099
Otero	2,633	41.54%	3,277	51.71%	427	6.75%	-644	-10.17%	6,337
Ouray	1,295	49.76%	1,164	44.73%	143	5.51%	131	5.03%	2,602
Park	2,848	37.97%	4,089	54.52%	562	7.51%	-1,241	-16.55%	7,499
Phillips	555	28.72%	1,274	65.94%	103	5.34%	-719	-37.22%	1,932
Pitkin	5,091	69.51%	1,951	26.63%	282	3.86%	3,140	42.88%	7,324
Prowers	1,182	31.98%	2,271	61.44%	243	6.58%	-1,089	-29.46%	3,696
Pueblo	28,779	53.89%	22,031	41.26%	2,585	4.85%	6,748	12.63%	53,395
Rio Blanco	480	18.96%	1,883	74.39%	168	6.65%	-1,403	-55.43%	2,531
Rio Grande	1,871	42.38%	2,291	51.90%	252	5.72%	-420	-9.52%	4,414
Routt	5,281	56.19%	3,696	39.32%	421	4.49%	1,585	16.87%	9,398
Saguache	1,382	58.16%	838	35.26%	156	6.58%	544	22.90%	2,376
San Juan	234	52.46%	177	39.68%	35	7.68%	57	12.78%	446
San Miguel	2,064	68.45%	766	25.40%	185	6.15%	1,298	43.05%	3,015
Sedgwick	397	36.62%	592	54.61%	95	8.76%	-195	-17.99%	1,084
Summit	5,832	58.30%	3,713	37.11%	458	4.59%	2,119	21.19%	10,003
Teller	2,982	30.52%	6,249	63.96%	539	5.52%	-3,267	-33.44%	9,770
Washington	470	21.01%	1,619	72.40%	147	6.59%	-1,149	-51.39%	2,236
Weld	29,389	36.99%	45,482	57.24%	4,574	5.77%	-16,093	-20.25%	79,445
Yuma	1,010	26.37%	2,614	68.26%	205	5.37%	-1604	-41.89%	3,829
Totals	854,685	48.07%	824,789	46.39%	98,414	5.53%	29,896	1.68%	1,777,668
