= Paula Sandoval =

American politician

Paula E. Sandoval
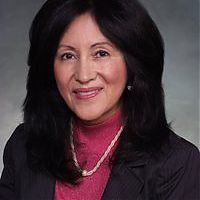

Member of Denver City Council from the 1st district
- In office May 2010 – July 18, 2011
- Preceded by: Rick Garcia
- Succeeded by: Susan Shepherd

Member of the Colorado Senate from the 34th district
- In office January 2003 – May 2010
- Preceded by: Rob Hernandez
- Succeeded by: Lucía Guzmán

Personal details
- Born: Chicago, Illinois
- Party: Democratic
- Spouse: Paul Sandoval
- Profession: Small business owner

Paula E. Sandoval is a politician from Denver, Colorado. From 2002 to 2010, she served in the Colorado State Senate. She resigned from the State Senate in May 2010 after winning a special election to fill a vacant seat in District 1 of the Denver City Council. In 2011, she began to campaign for re-election to the seat, but abandoned her campaign after her husband became ill.

== Biography ==
Sandoval is a lifelong resident of Colorado. Although she was born in Chicago, Illinois, she has spent nearly her entire life in Colorado. She attended the Denver public schools. She attained a Bachelor of Arts from the University of Colorado Boulder and a master's degree in public administration from the University of Colorado Denver.

Sandoval and her husband, former state senator Paul Sandoval, started a small business, Tamales by La Casita, Inc. Between the two of them, they have been in business over twenty-five years. Today they have two locations and provide employment for eighteen different families.

Sandoval has a long history of public service. She serves on the Denver Welfare Reform Board, the Greenway Foundation, the Colorado State Historical Society, and the Colorado Commission of Aging. Most recently she was appointed as vice chair for the fiscal committee for the Council of State Government Western Region. Formerly she served on the board of governors for the Colorado State University System.

In the four years that Sandoval has served in the General Assembly, she has concentrated on social legislation and legislation to benefit children. Most notably she was the prime senate sponsor for the low-income energy assistance bill, the Kids First License Plate, the Healthy School Vending Bill, the High-Risk Alternative Education bill and the Colorado Schoolchildren's Asthma and Anaphylaxis Health Management Act.

She has received numerous awards including Legislator of the Year for the American Heart Association, Colorado Food Service Association and Colorado Association of Non-Profits. She also is a Gates Foundation Fellow to the Harvard JFK School of Government, State and Local Government Program, and a Henry Toll Fellow.
