= Joyce Lawrence =

Joyce Lawrence may refer to:

- Joyce Carey née Lawrence, English actress
- Joyce Lawrence (politician), member of the Colorado House of Representatives
- Joy Liebert, married name Joyce Lawrence, English cricketer
