= Lucía Guzmán =

American politician

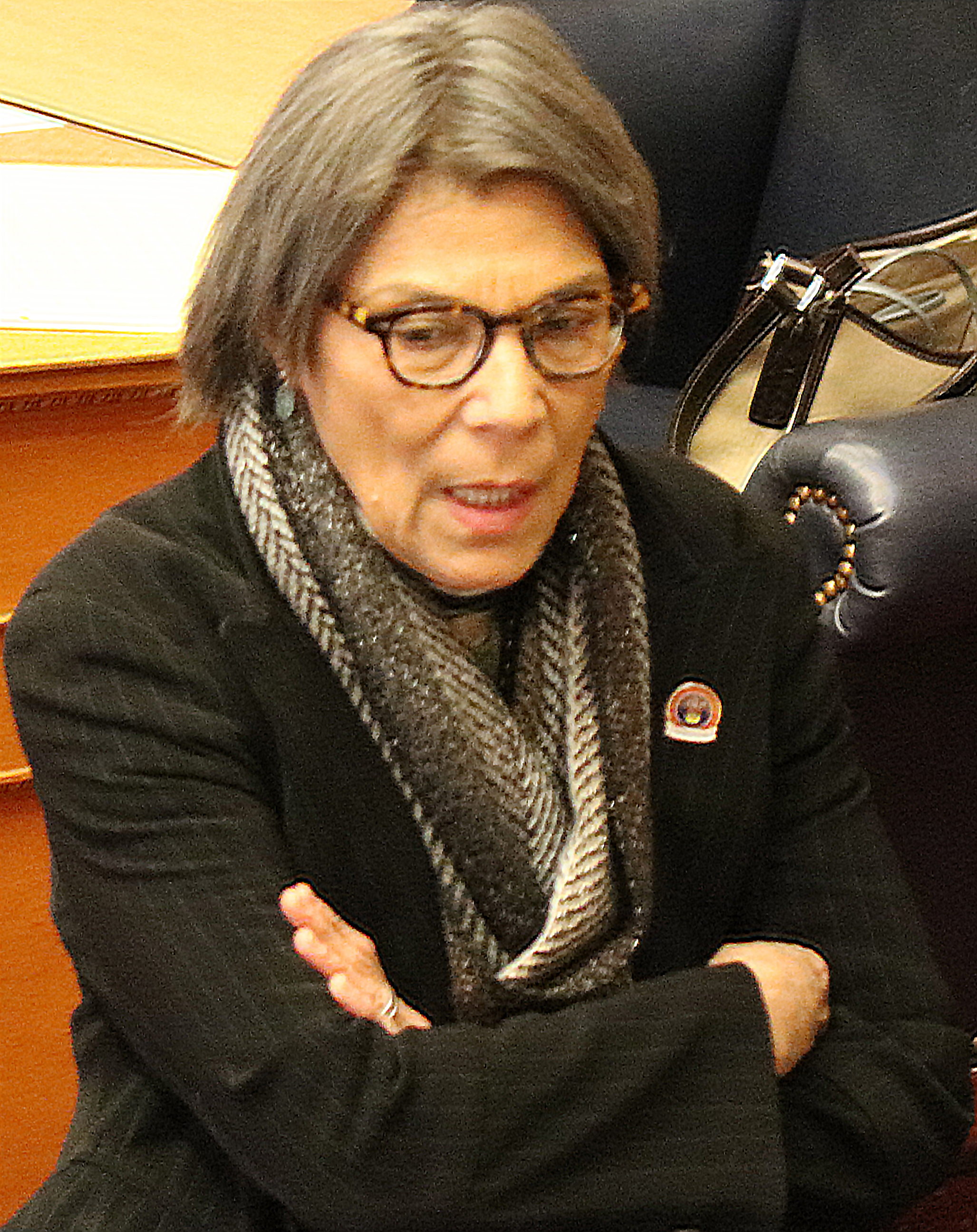

Member of the Colorado Senate from the 34th district
- In office May 21, 2010 – January 4, 2019
- Preceded by: Paula Sandoval
- Succeeded by: Julie Gonzales

Personal details
- Born: c. 1945 Texas, U.S.
- Party: Democratic
- Spouse: Martha Eubanks
- Education: Sam Houston State University (BS); Iliff School of Theology (MS)

Lucía Guzmán (born 1945) is an American minister and politician who served in the Colorado Senate from the 34th district as a member of the Democratic Party from 2010 to 2019. Prior to her tenure in the state senate she served on the school board in Denver and led the Colorado Council of Churches.

Guzmán was born to farm workers from Mexico and educated at Sam Houston State University and the Iliff School of Theology. She became a minister in the United Methodist Church and led the Colorado Council of Churches before being elected to the school board. Mayor John Hickenlooper appointed her to manage the Agency for Human Rights.

She was appointed to replace Paula Sandoval in the state senate and served until she was term-limited in the 2018 election. During her tenure in the state senate she served as the Minority Leader until she resigned in protest of the Republican's handling of sexual harassment cases in the legislature.

== Early life ==
Guzmán was born in Katy, Texas, in 1945, as one of nine children to farm workers from Mexico. Her father, Tomas Guzmán, was murdered at age seventy-three in 1975, during a gas station robbery. She graduated with a Bachelor of Science degree from Sam Houston State University. and a Master of Science in divinity from the Iliff School of Theology. She worked at the University of Texas Medical Branch from 1975 to 1983.

== Career ==
=== Local politics ===
Guzmán became an ordained minister in the United Methodist Church in 1992. She led the Colorado Council of Churches from 1994 to 1999, and was the first Hispanic and woman to lead it. Guzmán left the council to run against Rita Montero for a seat on the Denver school board and served on it from 1999 to 2007. She was appointed by Mayor John Hickenlooper to manage the Agency for Human Rights. She is married to Martha Eubanks.

=== Colorado Senate ===
==== Elections ====
Paula Sandoval resigned from the Colorado Senate to serve on the Denver city council in 2010, and Guzmán was appointed to replace her. She defeated Representative Joel Judd in the primary and won in the general election. She was reelected in the 2014 election against Republican nominee Stuart Siffring and Libertarian nominee Brian Scriber. She was term-limited during the 2018 election and endorsed Julie Gonzales, who won in the general election, to succeed her.

==== Tenure ====
Guzmán served on the Joint Agriculture and Natural Resources, and Judiciary committees. She replaced Senator Steve King as chair of the Legislative Audit committee while King faced felony charges. She was a member of the LGBTQ caucus. She supported Hillary Clinton during the 2008 Democratic presidential primaries and 2016 primaries and Amy Klobuchar in the 2020 primaries.

In 2015, she was selected to replace Senator Morgan Carroll as the Minority Leader in the state senate after Carroll gave the position up so that she could run for a seat in the United States House of Representatives from the 6th congressional district. She was the first Latina lesbian to serve as Minority Leader in the Colorado General Assembly.

She resigned her position as Minority Leader in protest of the Republican's handling of sexual harassment allegations against members of the state senate. She stated that the last straw was when the Republicans condemned Senator Daniel Kagan for demanding a floor debate on the conduct of Senator Randy Baumgardner. Guzmán and Senator Leroy Garcia switched positions with Garcia becoming Minority Leader while Guzmán became the assistant minority leader.

== Political positions ==
Guzmán introduced legislation to add homeless people to the list of protected categories in hate crime legislation. She introduced legislation to abolish the death penalty in 2013. She and nine other Democrats in the state senate were given a score of 100% from the AFL–CIO.

She introduced and supported legislation to create same-sex civil unions and to prohibit conversion therapy on minors. Guzmán was among thirty-seven legislators who endorsed a letter in 2018, calling for Planned Parenthood to allow for their workers to form a union. She received an A rating from NARAL Pro-Choice America.

== Electoral history ==
2010 Colorado Senate 34th district election
Primary election
Party	Candidate	Votes	%
Democratic	Lucía Guzmán	6,402	61.93%
Democratic	Joel Judd	3,936	38.07%
Total votes		10,338	100.00%
General election
Democratic	Lucía Guzmán	21,273	77.66%
Republican	Derec C. Shuler	6,121	22.34%
Total votes		27,394	100.00%

2014 Colorado Senate 34th district election
Primary election
Party	Candidate	Votes	%
Democratic	Lucía Guzmán (incumbent)	6,507	100.00%
Total votes		6,507	100.00%
General election
Democratic	Lucía Guzmán (incumbent)	31,889	74.38%
Republican	Stuart Siffring	8,390	19.57%
Libertarian	Brian Scriber	2,592	6.05%
Total votes		42,871	100.00%
