= Tom Wiens =

American businessman and politician

Member of the Colorado Senate from the 4th district
- In office January 12, 2005 – January 7, 2009
- Preceded by: Ken Chlouber
- Succeeded by: Mark Scheffel

Member of the Colorado House of Representatives from the 45th district
- In office January 9, 2003 – January 6, 2005
- Preceded by: Joyce Lawrence
- Succeeded by: Jim Sullivan

Personal details
- Party: Republican

Tom Wiens is an American businessman and politician from the state of Colorado. A member of the Republican Party, he was elected to one term each in both houses of the Colorado State Legislature, serving in the State House from 2003 to 2005 and the State Senate from 2005 to 2009.

== Political career ==
Wiens was the Republican nominee for Colorado State Treasurer in 1978, taking 43% of the vote against incumbent Democrat Roy Romer. He also ran for U.S. House in Colorado's 3rd congressional district in 1982, challenging Democratic incumbent Ray Kogovsek. Wiens polled 45% of the vote in the general election. In 2002, Wiens successfully ran for an open seat in the Colorado House of Representatives, winning by a wide margin in both the primary and general elections. After serving one term, he successfully sought a promotion to the state senate in 2004. He chaired the Republican Senate caucus from 2005 to 2007. Wiens chose not to run for re-election in 2008.

In 2009, Wiens was rumored to be considering a campaign for the 2010 Colorado gubernatorial election. However, he instead announced that he would run in the U.S. Senate race. Wiens took just 16% of the vote at the 2010 Republican caucus and dropped out of the race two months later, endorsing Ken Buck, who would go on to win the primary but lose the general election. In August 2010, Wiens expressed interest in running for governor if former U.S. Representative Scott McInnis lost the Republican primary or dropped out of the race. McInnis did indeed lose the primary, but Wiens chose to endorse Constitution Party nominee Tom Tancredo rather than run himself.

== Professional career ==
Wiens has experience as a project manager and entrepreneur, serving on the boards of multi-state bank and capital management companies. He also owns a ranch in the Rocky Mountain Foothills.

In 2006, Wiens was sued in federal court by a former customer who accused him of fraud and breach of contract.

== Personal life ==
Wiens lives in Sedalia.
