= Mark Scheffel =

American politician

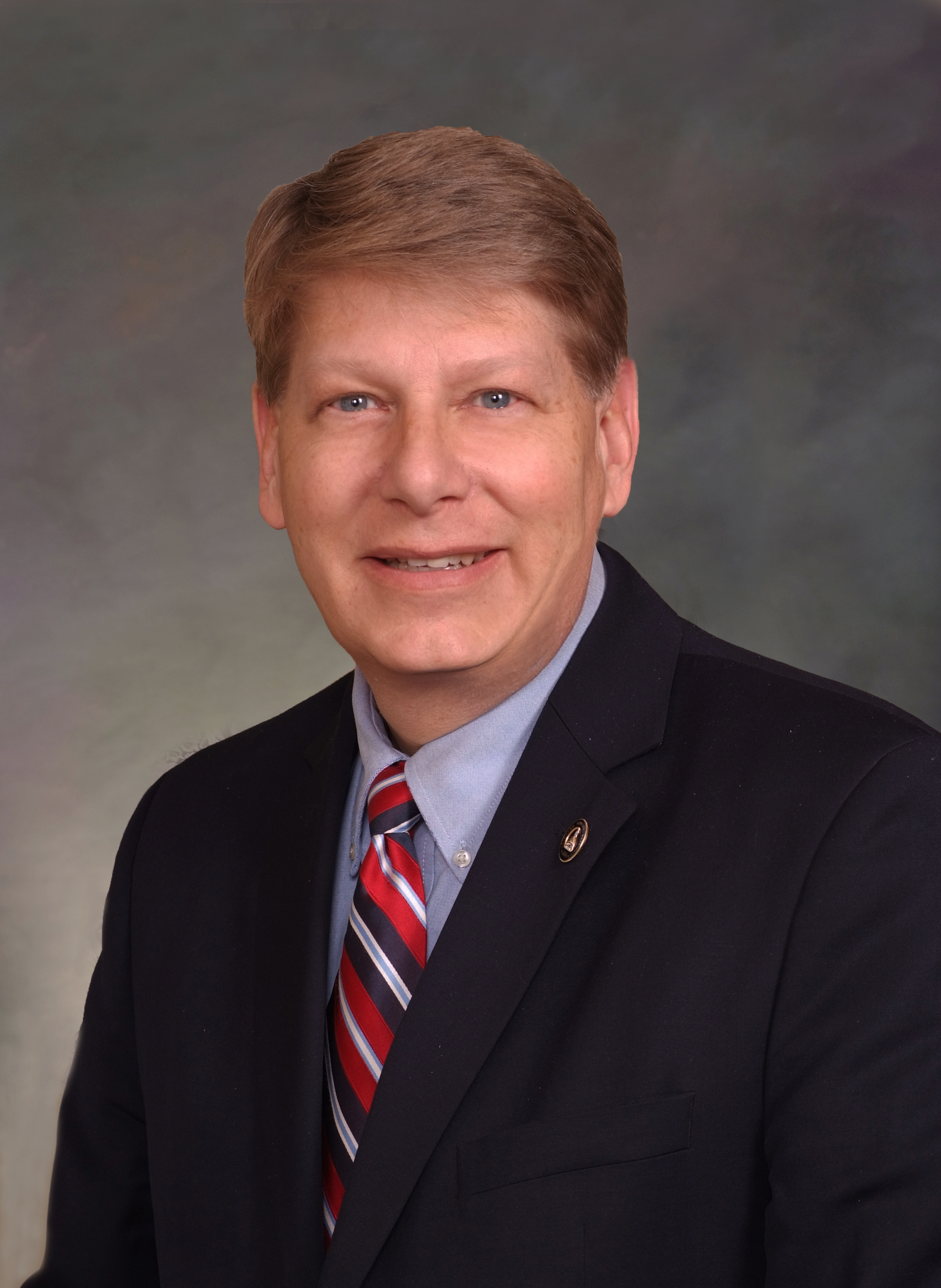
- Scheffel in 2011

Majority Leader of the Colorado Senate
- In office January 7, 2015 – January 11, 2017
- Preceded by: Rollie Heath
- Succeeded by: Chris Holbert

Member of the Colorado Senate from the 4th district
- In office January 7, 2009 – January 11, 2017
- Preceded by: Tom Wiens
- Succeeded by: Jim Smallwood

Personal details
- Born: August 27, 1959 (age 66)
- Party: Republican
- Spouse: Cheri
- Education: University of Denver; John Marshall Law School; New York University

Mark Scheffel is an American politician and a former Majority Leader of the Colorado Senate. First elected to the Colorado State Senate as a Republican in 2008, Scheffel represented Senate District 4 in Douglas County, which encompasses Castle Rock, Larkspur, Parker, Franktown, and Castle Pines. Term limited, he did not run for re-election in the 2016 elections, so his term ended in January, 2017.

== Biography ==
Mark Scheffel earned a bachelor's degree in finance from the University of Denver in 1982, then later a J.D. from John Marshall Law School in 1987 and an LL.M. in tax law from the New York University School of Law in 1998. A practicing business and tax attorney since 1989, he has worked as an attorney for his own firm, Reid and Scheffel, since 1993. In 2003 he was named Elbert County Attorney, a post that he held through 2008.

Active in the Douglas County Republican Party, he has served as a precinct committee person, district captain, chaired the Douglas County Republican GOTV effort and the bylaws committee of the Colorado Republican Party, and was chairman of the Douglas County Republican Party for two terms, from 2004 to 2007.

Scheffel has also served on the board of the Skycliff Stroke Center and on the citizen advisory board for The Wildlife Experience. He was a founding incorporator and charter director of Champion Bank. Scheffel and his wife Cheri reside with their four children in Parker, Colorado.

== Legislative career ==
=== 2016 legislative session ===
In his final legislative session as a State Senator, Majority Leader Mark Scheffel proved himself a champion for school safety with the passage of HB-1063 and SB-193. HB-1063 creates a safer learning environment for students and aids in the gathering of information that could potentially threaten the school, its staff or students. SB-193 provides a needed extension of the Safe2tell program. Safe2tell has successfully prevented security threats by allowing users to anonymously submit tips reporting concerns or threats to individuals or communities. In addition to school safety, Majority Leader Scheffel sponsored SB-183, creating a task force to study 911 call oversight and outage reliability.

=== 2015 legislative session ===
In the 2015 Legislative Session, Majority Leader Mark Scheffel introduced Senate Bill 177, a bi-partisan measure to address construction defects. SB 177 would have forced homeowners associations (HOAs) to use arbitration or mediation before suing a developmental party where construction defects are an issue. The bill also included a provision to allow a judge to appoint an arbitrator or mediator where such a person had not been agreed upon by concerned parties, and would have required transparency by the HOA to housing unit owners. Additionally, Senator Scheffel sponsored SB 213 and SB 214, both school safety measures, and both signed by the Governor. He chaired the interim School Safety and Youth in Crisis Committee.

=== 2014 legislative session ===
During the 2014 Session Senator Scheffel sponsored Senate Bill 183 which increases local governments' abilities to offer tax credits to companies that they are trying to attract or to growing companies that are considering moving to other states. Additionally, during the 2014 Legislative Session Senator Scheffel worked alongside a bipartisan group of legislators on a variety of bills regarding telecommunication reform. Senator Scheffel was the Senate co-sponsored House Bill 1327, which expanded the elopement of telecommunications networks in the state and House Bill 1329 which deregulate Internet-based services, such as Vonage and Skype. Senator Scheffel also championed the attempted modification of the Colorado Construction Defect Law.

=== 2013 legislative session ===
Senator Scheffel was re-elected by the Senate Republican Caucus to serve as the Assistant Minority Leader for the 2013 legislative session. He was appointed to the Senate Education Committee, as well as the Legislative Council.

During the 2013 Senator Scheffel sponsored Senate Bill 13-176 which authorized the state treasurer to invest state moneys in debt obligations backed by the full faith and credit of the state of Israel. Additionally Senator Scheffel was the Senate Sponsor of House Bill 13-1177 which created a tax break for taxpayer's business personal property.

=== 2012 election ===
During the 2012 elections, Scheffel faced no opposition during the primaries. In the general election, he opposed Democratic candidate Holly Gorman and Libertarian candidate Chris Grundermann, both of whom he defeated with 64.3% of the vote.

=== 2012 legislative session ===
During the 2012 session, Senator Scheffel was appointed to the Finance and Judiciary Committees. In addition, he served on the Legislative Council due to his role as Assistant Minority Leader in the Republican Caucus.

An important piece of legislation Scheffel sponsored this year was SB12-157 which focused on the regulation of telecommunication services while also enacting the "Telecommunications Modernization Act of 2012". The bill, sponsored by a bipartisan group of legislators, sought to reduce service fees and increase broadband service to rural areas. Senator Scheffel said that the bill was "the result of more than a year of work on the part of the legislators and other government officials and agencies. The bill was assigned to the Senate Business, Labor, and Technology Committee, where it was passed and sent on the Senate Appropriations. However, in the Appropriations Committee, they could not agree on terms, and therefore the bill failed to pass and was postponed indefinitely.

=== 2011 legislative session ===
In 2011, Scheffel was elected to act as the Assistant Minority Leader for the Colorado Senate Republican Caucus, following Senator Kopp's retirement that same year. He also sponsored several bills that year, most notably regarding business personal property taxes: SB11-026 and HB11-1141. However, both bills were killed in the Democratic-controlled Senate, and were postponed indefinitely in committee.

In addition, Scheffel was honored as the Independent Bankers 2011 Champion of Main Street Colorado Award, which recognizes state lawmakers who "understand, value, and champion local community banks and small businesses."

=== 2010 legislative session ===
During this legislative session Senator Scheffel sponsored several bills, one of which focused on increasing the transparency in the use of gifts, grants, and donations to fund programs by state agencies. HB 10-1178 required that any state agencies that received such gifts would have to make annual reports to the General Assembly. The bill successfully passed through the legislature before it was sent to the Governor and signed to be enacted.

In addition, following the 2010 legislative session Scheffel was honored with the James T. Brubaker Legislative Award.

=== 2009 legislative session ===
In November 2008, Scheffel was named to a special legislative Committee on Job Creation and Economic Growth, tasked with developing recommendations on bolstering Colorado's economy before the 2009 legislative session. Stemming from this interim committee, Senator Scheffel set his focus on bills during the 2009 legislative session regarding exemptions from property taxation for business personal property: SB09-085 created a task force to study the possibility, and HB09-1068 would have created such an exemption. Senate Bill 85 successfully passed through both the House and Senate before being signed by Governor Bill Ritter (politician); however, House Bill 1068 failed to pass through the House Finance committee before being postponed indefinitely.

=== 2008 election ===
After incumbent Senator Tom Wiens announced in April 2008 that he would not run for a second term, Scheffel announced his candidacy for the seat; he had briefly sought the seat in 2004 before Wiens declared his candidacy. Scheffel defeated three other contenders — Ed Brewer, Mark Vanderbilt, and Randy Reed — to take 65 percent of the vote at the Republican district assembly in May, the only candidate to qualify for the ballot by the assembly process. Financial advisor and Air Force veteran Bob Denny petitioned onto the Republican primary ballot. During the primary campaign, Scheffel touted his experience as a tax attorney and familiarity as an asset in the legislature, but was outraised by Denny, who took in about $24,000 to Scheffel's $18,000. Scheffel was also endorsed by retiring U.S. Rep. Tom Tancredo. Mark Scheffel ultimately defeated Bob Denney in the contested Republican primary in August, taking 65 percent of votes cast.

Scheffel faced Democrat Joe Alsup in the November 2008 general election. Alsup's candidacy was endorsed by the Denver Post, but Scheffel won with 68 percent of the popular vote.

== Legislative awards ==
- 2015 Colorado Telecommunications Association Rural Broadband Leadership Award
- 2014 Jewish Community Relations Council Legislative Appreciation Award
- 2013 Colorado Association of Home-builders Defender of the American Dream Award
- 2013 APEX Technology Advocate of the Year
- 2012 Economic Development Council of Colorado Legislator of the year
- Colorado Mortgage Lenders Association Legislator of the Year
- 2009–2012 Independent Bankers Association Champion of Main Street Colorado
