= Mildred Mattingly =

American teacher and state legislator (1927-2021)

Member of the Colorado House of Representatives from the Pueblo County district
- In office 1993–1995
- Preceded by: Bill Thiebaut
- Succeeded by: Joyce Lawrence

Personal details
- Born: Mildred Gust; May 3, 1927 Pueblo, Colorado
- Died: November 1, 2021 (aged 94)
- Spouse: Donald Mattingly (m. 1957)
- Education: Western Colorado University
- Occupation: teacher, state legislator

Mildred Mattingly (née Gust; 1927-2021) was a teacher and state legislator in Colorado. From 1993 to 1994, she represented Pueblo County in the Colorado House of Representatives. A Democrat, she was a delegate to the Democratic National Convention in 1978 and represented District 47 in the Colorado House.

== Early life and education ==
Gust was born on May 3, 1927, in Pueblo, Colorado to William Sterling and Minion Edith (née Riley) Gust. She had at least one sibling.

In 1945, Gust graduated from Centennial High School, after which she attended Pueblo Junior College before receiving a degree in history and teaching certificate from Western State.

== Career ==
Mattingly taught history in Colorado's District 60 for 31 years.

Mattingly officially began her political work when she was selected as a delegate for the 1976 Democratic National Convention, representing the third district. In 1993, she was appointed to represent Pueblo County in the Colorado House of Representatives after Bill Thiebaut moved to the Colorado Senate. While in office, she sponsored a bill to make Pueblo the permanent headquarters for the Colorado Lottery. Mattingly lost her seat to Joyce Lawrence for the 1995 election.

== Personal life ==
Mildred Gust married Donald Mattingly in 1957. The couple had three daughters.

She died November 1, 2021.
