= Mattingley =

Village and parish in Hampshire, England

Coordinates: 51.313705°N 0.948767°W

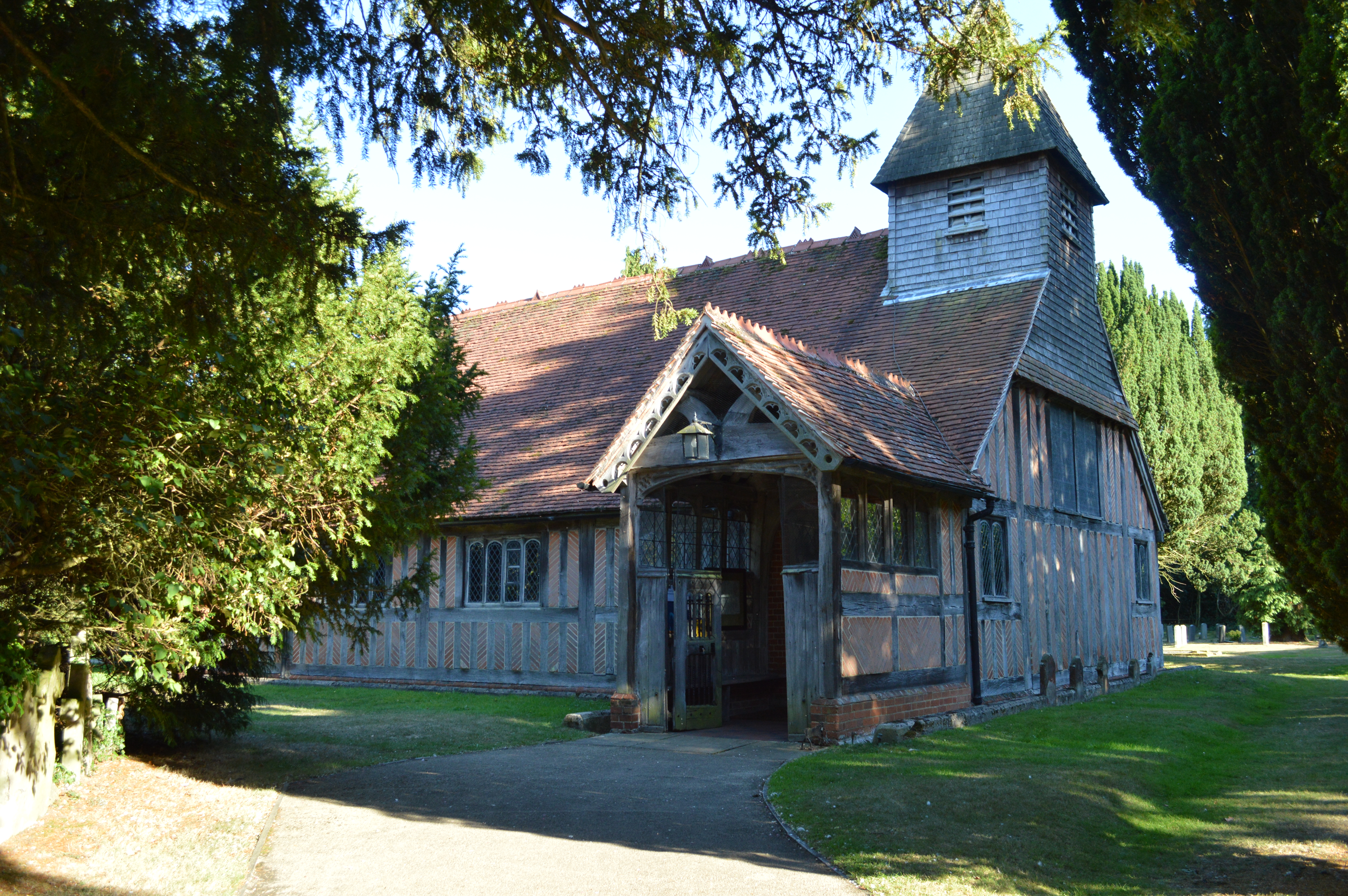
- Mattingley Church

- Location within Hampshire
- Population: 583 (2011 Census)
- OS grid reference: SU7336457701
  - London: 38 mi (61 km) ENE
- Civil parish: Mattingley
- District: Hart
- Shire county: Hampshire
- Region: South East
- Country: England
- Sovereign state: United Kingdom
- Post town: HOOK
- Postcode district: RG27
- Dialling code: 0118
- Police: Hampshire and Isle of Wight
- Fire: Hampshire and Isle of Wight
- Ambulance: South Central
- UK Parliament: North East Hampshire

Mattingley is a village and large civil parish in Hampshire, England. The village lies on the Reading road between the town of Hook and Reading. The River Whitewater runs through the parish. The village has one pub, named the Leather Bottle.

== History ==
The name comes from "Matta's ley" (ley means place in Old English), referring to the Matta family. The Mattingly surname originates in Mattingley.

In Imperial Gazetteer of England and Wales (1870), John Marius Wilson described Mattingley as a "hamlet and a chapelry". It was part of Heckfield before becoming its own civil parish in 1894.

== Transport ==
Mattingley is served by Hook railway station, which is on the London and South Western Railway.
