= Julie Gonzales =

American politician from Colorado

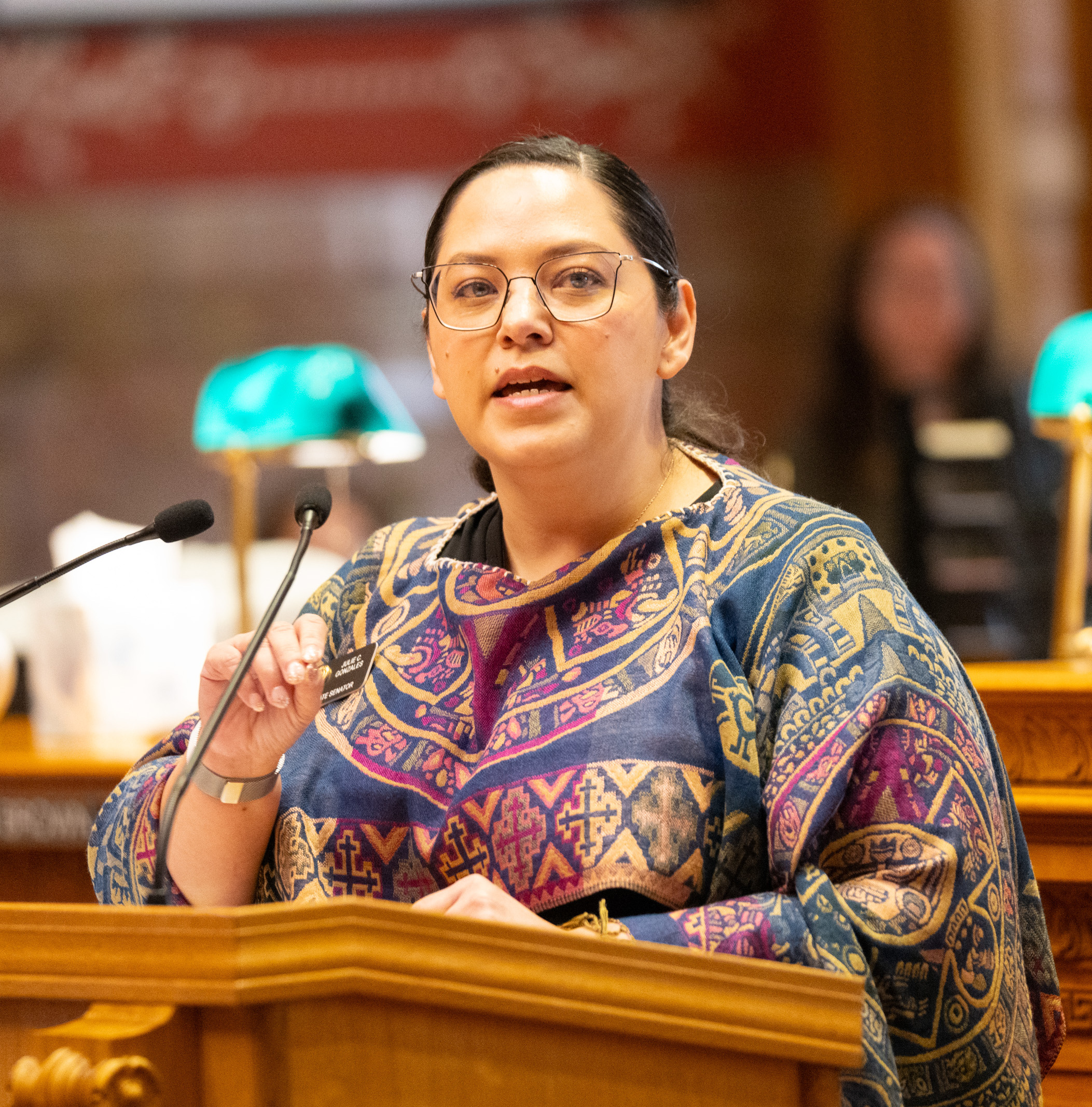
- Gonzales in 2025

Member of the Colorado Senate from the 34th district
- Incumbent
- Assumed office January 4, 2019
- Preceded by: Lucía Guzmán
- Succeeded by: Chela Garcia Irlando (elect)

Personal details
- Born: March 14, 1983 (age 43) San Carlos Apache Indian Reservation, Arizona, U.S.
- Party: Democratic
- Education: Yale University (BA)

Julie Gonzales (born March 14, 1983) is an American politician serving as a member of the Colorado Senate from the 34th district in the City and County of Denver since her election in 2018. She is a progressive member of the Democratic Party. She has served as Senate majority whip and supported progressive causes including death penalty repeal, abortion rights, and immigrant protections.

In December 2025, Gonzales announced a campaign for the 2026 United States Senate election in Colorado, challenging incumbent U.S. senator John Hickenlooper in the Democratic primary. She lost the primary to Hickenlooper.

== Early life and career ==
Gonzales was born on the San Carlos Apache reservation in Arizona and grew up in South Texas. She is the sixth of seven children born to Gloria and Mario Gonzales. Her father was a rancher, and is now a medical cannabis producer in northern New Mexico. Gonzales moved to Colorado after graduating from Yale University in 2005, where she studied History and Ethnicity, Race, and Migration.

After moving to Denver, Gonzales worked as a community organizer for affordable housing, environmentalism, teachers and workers rights, college-preparatory education, and immigrants rights. In 2016, Gonzales volunteered and caucused for Bernie Sanders' campaign, before being hired by the Colorado Democratic Party, where she served as Morgan Carroll's persuasion field director during her CD6 Congressional campaign, engaged volunteers, and turned out voters in support of Hillary Clinton. In 2017, Julie was elected by HD5 to serve as a member of the Party's Central Committee and Executive Committee.

== Colorado Senate ==
In the 2018 Colorado Senate election for the 34th district, Gonzales won the primary election with 14,798 votes (63.8%) and won the general election with 54,312 votes (83.1%), defeating Republican candidate Gordon Alley. She serves as the Senate Majority Whip and serves on the Judiciary committee, Local Government & Housing committee, Appropriations committee, Finance committee, Committee on Legal Services, and the Legislative Council.

In the Senate, Gonzales supported progressive legislation on criminal justice, reproductive rights, and immigration. In 2020, she sponsored SB 20–100, the bill which repealed Colorado's death penalty. In 2022, after the repeal of Roe v. Wade, she sponsored legislation to codify abortion access in Colorado statute. In 2025, Gonzales sponsored SB 25-276, a proposal to further limit Colorado state and local cooperation with federal immigration enforcement and to bar immigration operations in schools, hospitals, houses of worship, and child-care centers. In 2026, Gonzales sponsored and spoke at a Colorado Worker Rights United rally in favor of the 2026 Worker Protection Act.

== 2026 U.S. Senate campaign ==
On December 8, 2025, Gonzales announced her candidacy for the Democratic primary in the 2026 United States Senate election in Colorado against incumbent Senator John Hickenlooper. Gonzales described herself as an "insurgent progressive" and argued that more confrontational progressive politics were needed in response to rising living costs and the second presidency of Donald Trump. Gonzales also criticized Hickenlooper for voting to confirm several of Trump's cabinet nominees, calling those votes disqualifying. A Working Families Party poll conducted February 20–25, 2026, showed Hickenlooper in first place at 45% and Gonzalez in second place at 13%.

In December 2025, the Colorado Democratic Party told several Gonzales workers that they would be blacklisted from future Democratic work if they challenged Hickenlooper. The Colorado Democratic Party later distanced itself from these threats.

On March 28, 2026, the Colorado Democratic Party concluded its convention, which eliminated all primary candidates except Hickenlooper and Gonzales. The primary election was held on June 30; Hickenlooper won.

== Political positions ==
Gonzales supports Medicare for All, universal child care, a higher federal minimum wage, a ban on congressional stock trading, Abolish ICE, protecting abortion rights and gender affirming care, and Palestinian self-determination. She has stated her belief that Israel is guilty of war crimes and genocide.

Gonzales was a member of the Democratic Socialists of America from 2018 to 2024. In March 2019, Gonzales co-signed a DSA National Electoral Committee letter to congratulate teachers strikes in Oakland, Los Angeles, West Virginia, Chicago, and Denver.
