= Teddy Collins (politician) =

American politician

Member-elect of the Colorado Senate from the 4th district
- Assuming office January 2027
- Succeeding: Mark Baisley

Personal details
- Party: Republican
- Website: www.collinsforcolorado.com

Teddy Collins is an American politician. A member of the Republican Party, he is the member-elect for the 4th district of the Colorado State Senate. He was elected at the 2026 election. He owns a gun shop.
