= Chela Garcia Irlando =

American politician

Member-elect of the Colorado Senate from the 34th district
- Assuming office January 2027
- Succeeding: Julie Gonzales

Personal details
- Party: Democratic
- Website: www.chelaforcolorado.com

Graciela "Chela" Garcia Irlando is an American politician. A member of the Democratic Party, she is the member-elect for the 34th district of the Colorado State Senate. She was elected at the 2026 election. She is executive director of the Next 100 Coalition, a national environmental nonprofit. She is of Hispanic descent.
