= Mark Baisley =

American politician (born 1955)

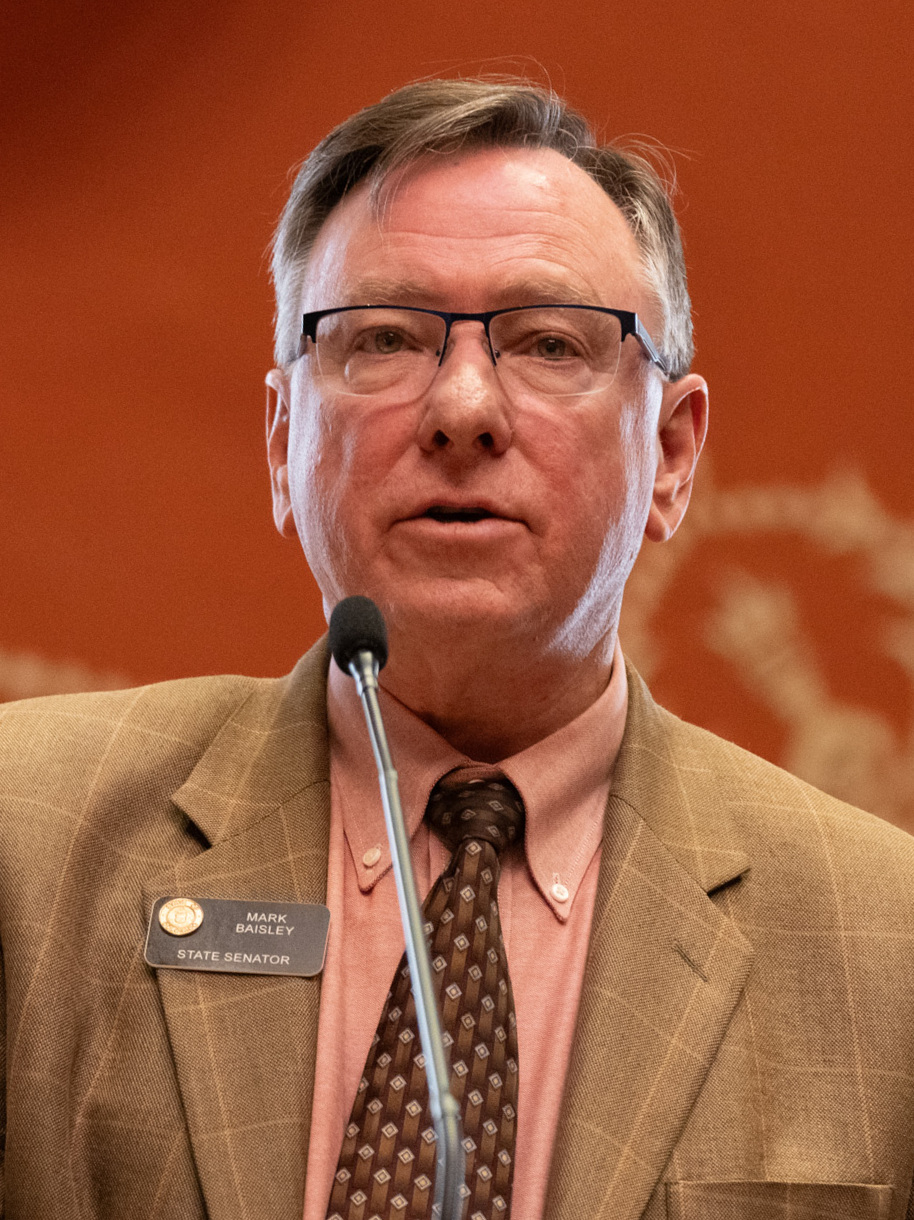
- Baisley in 2024

Member of the Colorado Senate from the 4th district
- Incumbent
- Assumed office January 9, 2023
- Preceded by: Jim Smallwood
- Succeeded by: Teddy Collins (elect)

Member of the Colorado House of Representatives from the 39th district
- In office January 4, 2019 – January 9, 2023
- Preceded by: Polly Lawrence
- Succeeded by: Brandi Bradley

Personal details
- Born: Mark Allan Baisley; August 2, 1955 (age 71) Hastings, Minnesota, U.S.
- Party: Republican
- Spouse: Maryann
- Education: Columbia College, Missouri (BS); University of Colorado, Colorado Springs (attended)
- Website: State senate website Campaign website

Mark Allan Baisley (born August 2, 1955) is an American politician who is a state senator from Roxborough Park, Colorado. A Republican, Baisley represents Colorado's 4th Senate district. Previously, he represented Colorado House of Representatives District 39, which encompassed parts of Douglas County and all of Teller County. He was the Republican nominee in the 2026 U.S. Senate election in Colorado, eventually losing to incumbent Democrat John Hickenlooper.

== Background ==
Baisley earned a bachelor's degree with dual degrees in computer information systems and business administration from Columbia College, Missouri in 1993. He currently works as the president of Slipglass, Inc., an engineering software firm. Baisley has been married to his high school sweetheart Maryann for more than 45 years. Maryann and Baisley, are the parents of four children and they also seven grandchildren.

== Career ==
Baisley was first elected as a state representative in the 2018 general elections. In that election, he defeated his Democratic and Libertarian party opponents, winning 62.61% of the vote.

Baisley was re-elected to the state house in 2020.

In 2022, Baisley ran for a seat in the Colorado State Senate. Specifically, he ran to represent Colorado's 4th Senate district. In the general election, he defeated his Democratic Party opponent, winning 60.84% of the vote.

In March 2025, Baisley announced his candidacy for the 2026 Colorado gubernatorial election. On January 5, 2026, he suspended his campaign for Governor and announced his candidacy for the 2026 United States Senate election instead. Baisley was the only candidate to receive at least 30% support from the Republican State Assembly, allowing him to advance to the primary unopposed. According to the election law organization States United Action, Baisley has promoted conspiracies theories and misinformation about the legitimacy of elections, especially the 2020 presidential election.

== Electoral history ==
2018 Colorado House of Representatives election, 39th District
Party	Candidate	Votes	%
Republican	Mark Baisley	29,289	62.61%
Democratic	Kamala Vanderkolk	16,167	34.56%
Libertarian	Tony Gross	1,325	2.83%
Total votes		46,781	100%
Republican hold			

2020 Colorado House of Representatives election, 39th District
Party	Candidate	Votes	%
Republican	Mark Baisley (incumbent)	37,657	63.04%
Democratic	Ian Chapman	20,257	33.91%
Libertarian	Bonnie Pyle	1,823	3.05%
Total votes		59,737	100%
Republican hold			

2022 Colorado Senate election, 4th District
Party	Candidate	Votes	%
Republican	Mark Baisley	55,595	60.84%
Democratic	Jeff Ravage	35,789	39.16%
Total votes		91,384	100%
Republican hold			

Party political offices
Preceded by Cory Gardner	Republican nominee for U.S. Senator from Colorado (Class 2); 2026	Most recent
