= David Mattingly =

David Mattingly may refer to:

- David B. Mattingly (born 1956), American illustrator
- David Mattingly (archaeologist) (born 1958), British historian and author
- Dave Mattingly (newscaster), NPR

== See also ==
- David Mattingley (1922–2017), Australian pilot
