= Joyce Lawrence (politician) =

American politician

Joyce R. Lawrence

Member of the Colorado House of Representatives from the 45th district
- In office January 11, 1995 – January 8, 2003
- Preceded by: Mildred Mattingly
- Succeeded by: Tom Wiens

Personal details
- Born: 1940 or 1941 (age 84–85) Bath, Michigan, US
- Party: Republican
- Spouse: Richard Lawrence (m. 1965)
- Children: 2
- Education: University of Michigan (BS); University of Phoenix (MBA)
- Occupation: Nurse; Nursing administrator

Joyce Lawrence (née Schram) is a former state legislator in Colorado. She served in the Colorado House of Representatives from 1995 to 2003. In 2002, she ran unsuccessfully for a state senate seat. A Republican, she served as Pueblo, Colorado's city council president. She served on the Capitol Development Committee including as its chair.
