= Colorado's 34th Senate district =

American legislative district

Colorado's 34th State Senate district
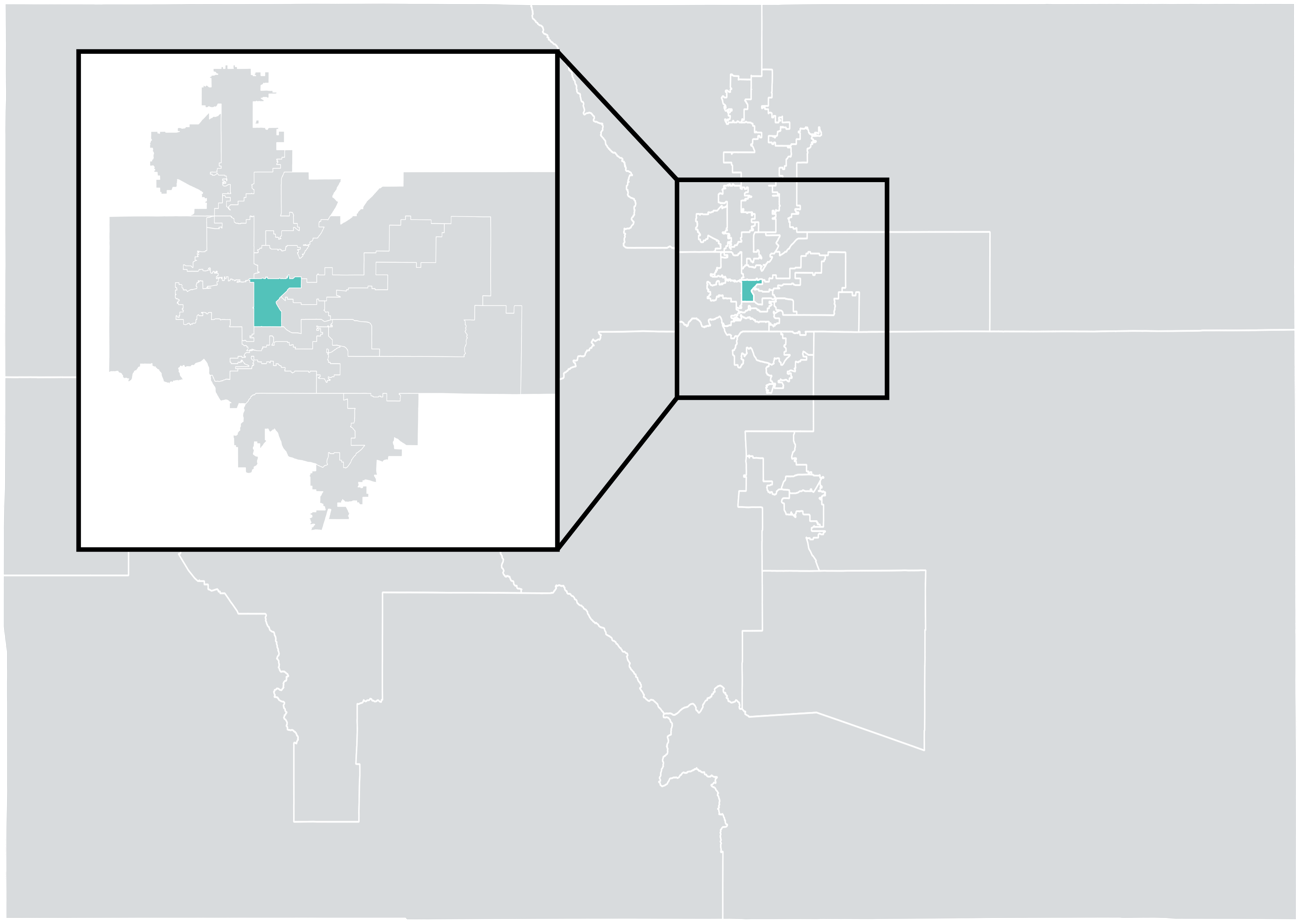
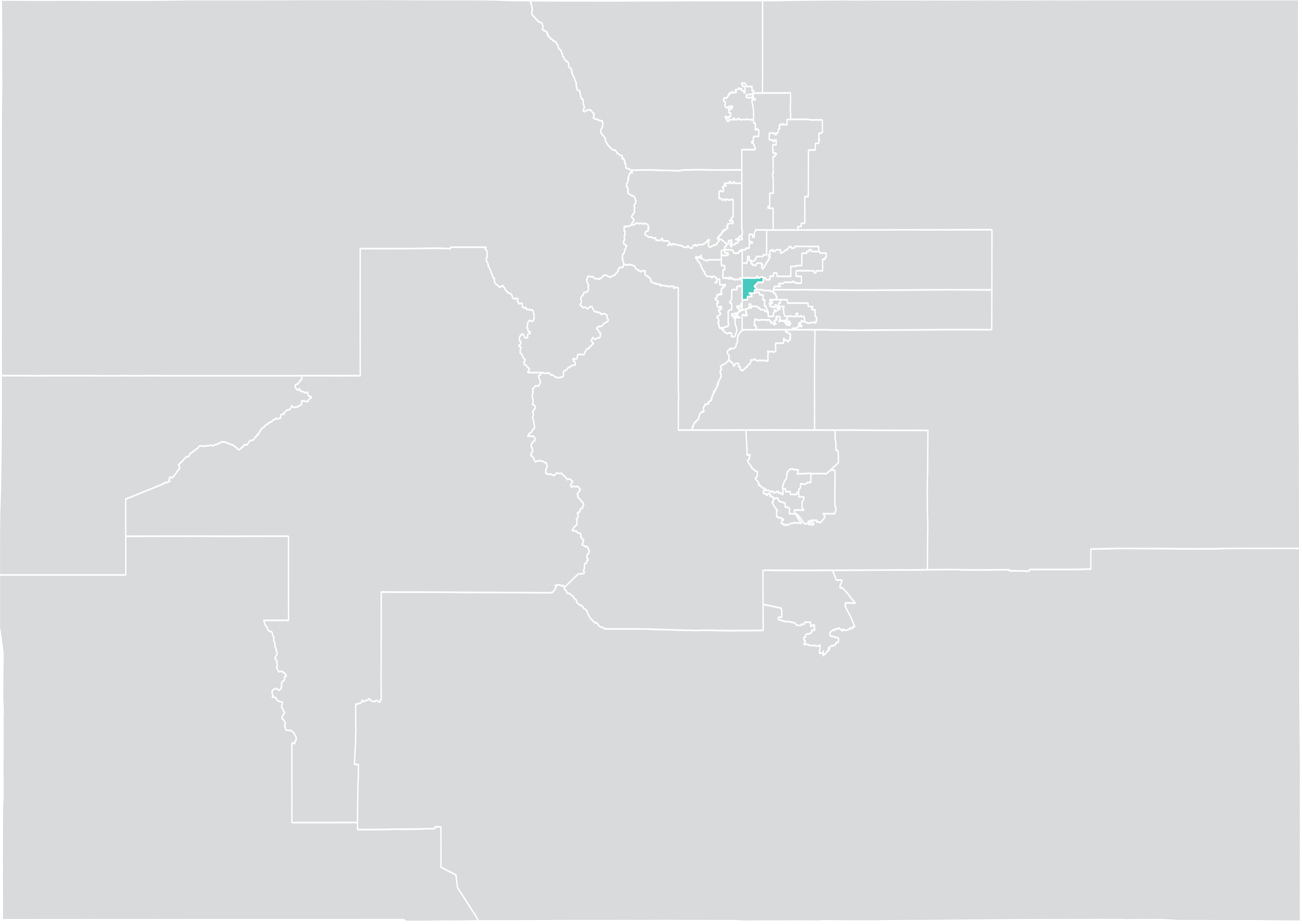
Senator
Julie Gonzales; D–Denver
- Registration: 40.4% Democratic; 7.6% Republican; 49.3% No party preference
- Demographics: 48% White; 4% Black; 44% Hispanic; 2% Asian; 1% Native American; 2% Other
- Population (2018): 160,801
- Registered voters: 117,339

Colorado's 34th Senate district is one of 35 districts in the Colorado Senate. It has been represented by Democrat Julie Gonzales since 2019, succeeding fellow Democrat Lucía Guzmán.

== List of state senators ==
- Lucía Guzmán
- Julie Gonzales
- Chela Garcia Irlando

== Geography ==
District 34 covers western and northwestern Denver.

The district is located entirely within Colorado's 1st congressional district, and overlaps with the 1st, 2nd, 4th, 5th, and 8th districts of the Colorado House of Representatives.

== Recent election results ==
Colorado state senators are elected to staggered four-year terms; under normal circumstances, the 34th district holds elections in midterm years. The 2022 election will be the first held under the state's new district lines.

=== 2022 ===
2022 Colorado State Senate election, District 34
Party	Candidate	Votes	%
Democratic	Julie Gonzales (incumbent)	48,831	100
Total votes		48,831	100

== Historical election results ==
=== 2018 ===
2018 Colorado State Senate election, District 34
Primary election
Party	Candidate	Votes	%
Democratic	Julie Gonzales	14,798	63.8
Democratic	Milo Schwab	4,574	19.7
Democratic	Alan Kennedy-Shaffer	3,821	16.5
Total votes		23,193	100
General election
Democratic	Julie Gonzales	54,312	83.1
Republican	Gordon Alley	11,018	16.9
Total votes		65,330	100
Democratic hold			

=== 2014 ===
2014 Colorado State Senate election, District 34
Party	Candidate	Votes	%
Democratic	Lucía Guzmán (incumbent)	31,889	74.4
Republican	Stuart Siffring	8,390	19.6
Libertarian	Brian Scriber	2,592	6.0
Total votes		42,871	100
Democratic hold			

=== Federal and statewide results ===
Year	Office	Results
2020	President	Biden 81.4 – 16.2%
2018	Governor	Polis 80.1 – 16.5%
2016	President	Clinton 76.0 – 16.1%
2014	Senate	Udall 74.2 – 20.1%
2014	Governor	Hickenlooper 77.7 – 17.5%
2012	President	Obama 77.4 – 20.1%
