= Colorado's 4th Senate district =

American legislative district

Colorado's 4th State Senate district
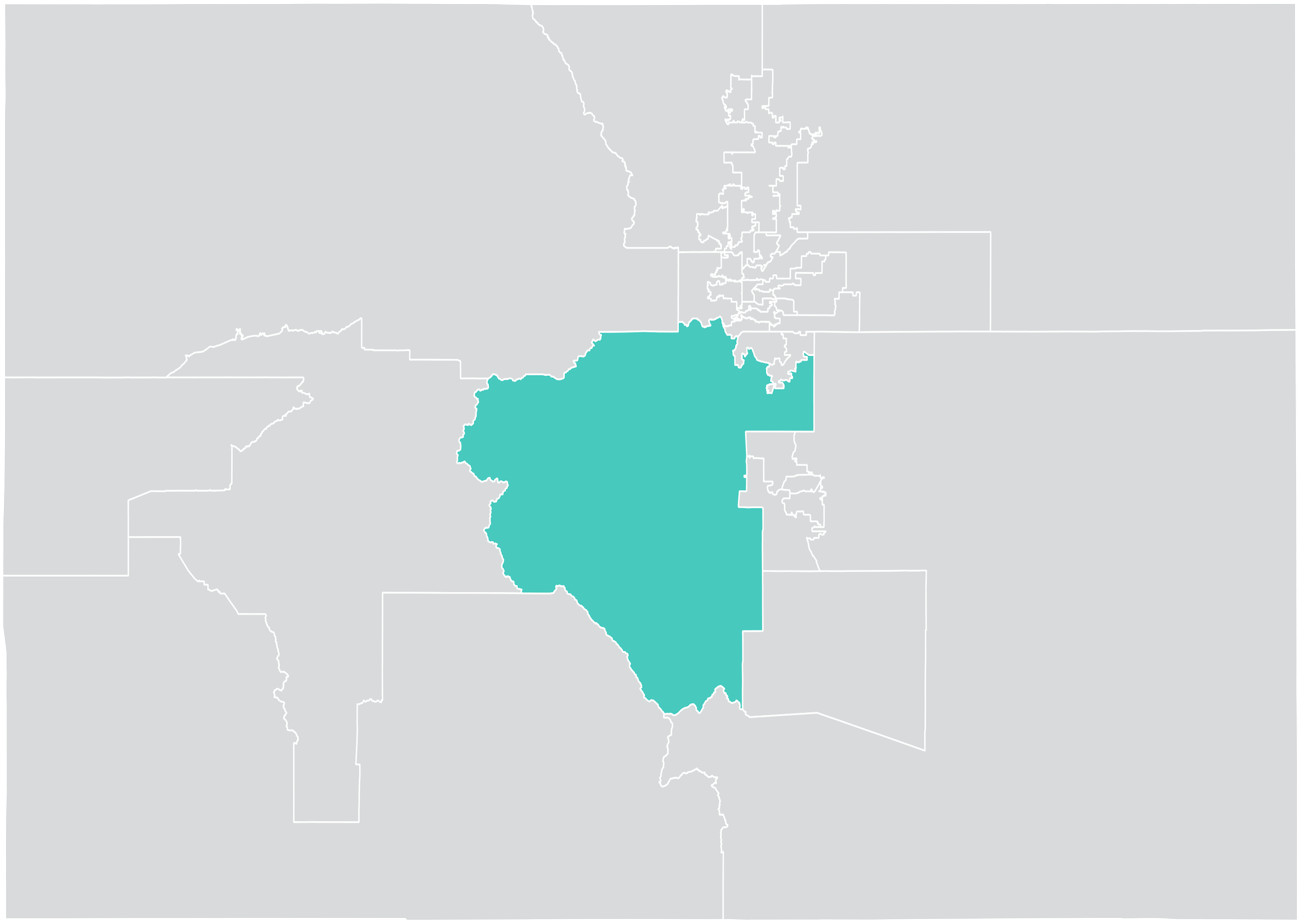
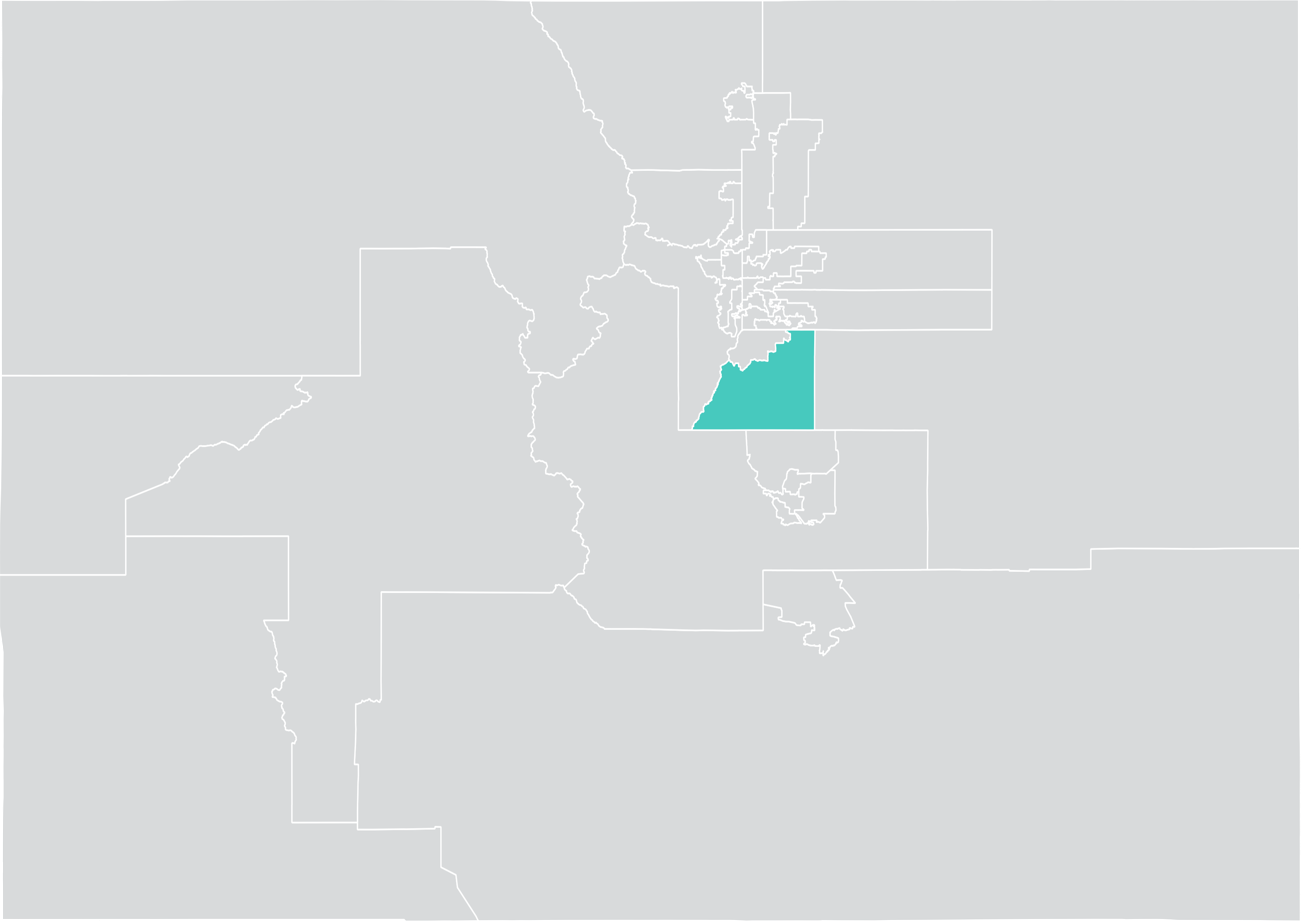
Senator
Mark Baisley; R–Roxborough Park
- Registration: 34.1% Republican; 16.4% Democratic; 47.3% No party preference
- Demographics: 84% White; 1% Black; 9% Hispanic; 2% Asian; 3% Other
- Population (2018): 167,965
- Registered voters: 141,074

Colorado's 4th Senate district is one of 35 districts in the Colorado Senate. It has been represented by Republican Mark Baisley since 2023. Prior to redistricting the district was represented by Republicans Jim Smallwood and Mark Scheffel.

== List of state senators ==
- Jim Smallwood
- Mark Scheffel
- Mark Baisley
- Teddy Collins

== Geography ==
District 4 is based in Douglas County on the southern outskirts of Denver, including Castle Pines, Castle Rock, Larkspur, Parker, Perry Park, The Pinery, and the southern tip of Aurora. It also includes Chaffee, Custer, Fremont and Park Counties.

The district overlaps with Colorado's 4th and 6th congressional districts, and with the 39th, 44th, 45th, and 60th districts of the Colorado House of Representatives.

== Composition and elections ==
Colorado State Senate members serve four-year terms, limited to two terms. Constitutional qualifications require senators to be U.S. citizens, at least 25 years old, and state residents for at least 12 months before election.

As of 2024, annual salaries were set at $43,977 for members elected after 2021, with additional per diem allowances determined by proximity to the state capitol. Vacancies are filled through appointments by the political party of the previous officeholder. Following the 2020 census, district boundaries were reconfigured by an independent redistricting commission in accordance with state constitutional guidelines for geographic compactness and preservation of municipal boundaries.

== Recent election results ==
Colorado state senators are elected to staggered four-year terms. The old 4th district held elections in presidential years, but the new district drawn following the 2020 Census will hold elections in midterm years.

=== 2022 ===
The 2022 election will be the first one held under the state's new district lines. Incumbent Senator Jim Smallwood was redistricted to the 2nd district, which isn't up until 2024, and State Rep. Mark Baisley is running for the 4th district instead.

2022 Colorado State Senate election, District 4
Party	Candidate	Votes	%
Republican	Mark Baisley	55,595	60.8
Democratic	Jeff Ravage	35,789	39.2
Total votes		91,384	100

== Historical election results ==
=== 2020 ===
2020 Colorado State Senate election, District 4
Party	Candidate	Votes	%
Republican	Jim Smallwood (incumbent)	73,832	62.3
Democratic	Elissa Flaumenhaft	41,526	35.0
Libertarian	Wayne Harlos	3,208	2.7
Total votes		118,566	100
Republican hold			

=== 2016 ===
2016 Colorado State Senate election, District 4
Primary election
Party	Candidate	Votes	%
Republican	Jim Smallwood	5,878	39.1
Republican	Benjamin Lyng	5,803	38.6
Republican	Jess Loban	3,368	22.4
Total votes		15,049	100
Democratic	Christina Riegel	2,876	65.9
Democratic	James Clark Huff	1,490	34.1
Total votes		4,366	100
General election
Republican	Jim Smallwood	62,981	69.4
Democratic	Christina Riegel	27,779	30.6
Total votes		90,760	100
Republican hold			

=== 2012 ===
2012 Colorado State Senate election, District 4
Party	Candidate	Votes	%
Republican	Mark Scheffel (incumbent)	50,173	63.9
Democratic	Holly Gorman	24,968	31.8
Libertarian	Chris Grundemann	3,437	4.4
Total votes		78,578	100
Republican hold			

=== Federal and statewide results ===
Year	Office	Results
2020	President	Trump 56.3 – 41.1%
2018	Governor	Stapleton 59.6 – 36.7%
2016	President	Trump 58.5 – 32.7%
2014	Senate	Gardner 65.5 – 29.7%
2014	Governor	Beauprez 62.6 – 34.0%
2012	President	Romney 64.5 – 33.8%
