= Delphinium umbraculorum =

Scientific classification
- Kingdom: Plantae
- Clade: Tracheophytes
- Clade: Angiosperms
- Clade: Eudicots
- Order: Ranunculales
- Family: Ranunculaceae
- Genus: Delphinium
- Species: D. umbraculorum

Binomial name
- Delphinium umbraculorum F.H.Lewis & Epling

Species of flowering plant

Delphinium umbraculorum is a species of larkspur known by the common name umbrella larkspur. However, its epithet does not denote an umbrella. Instead, it describes the habitat of this plant, usually shady and cool places. It is often confused with D. parryii which has similar flowers and D. patens which has similar stems and leaves. It is endemic to California, where it grows in the woodlands of the coastal mountain ranges from Monterey to Ventura Counties. It is a perennial herb producing an erect stem 40 to about 80 centimeters tall. The hairless leaves are located at the base of the plant and along the stem as well. The inflorescence bears several flowers with reflexed dark blue sepals and a spur over a centimeter long. The fruit is between 1 and 2 centimeters long.
