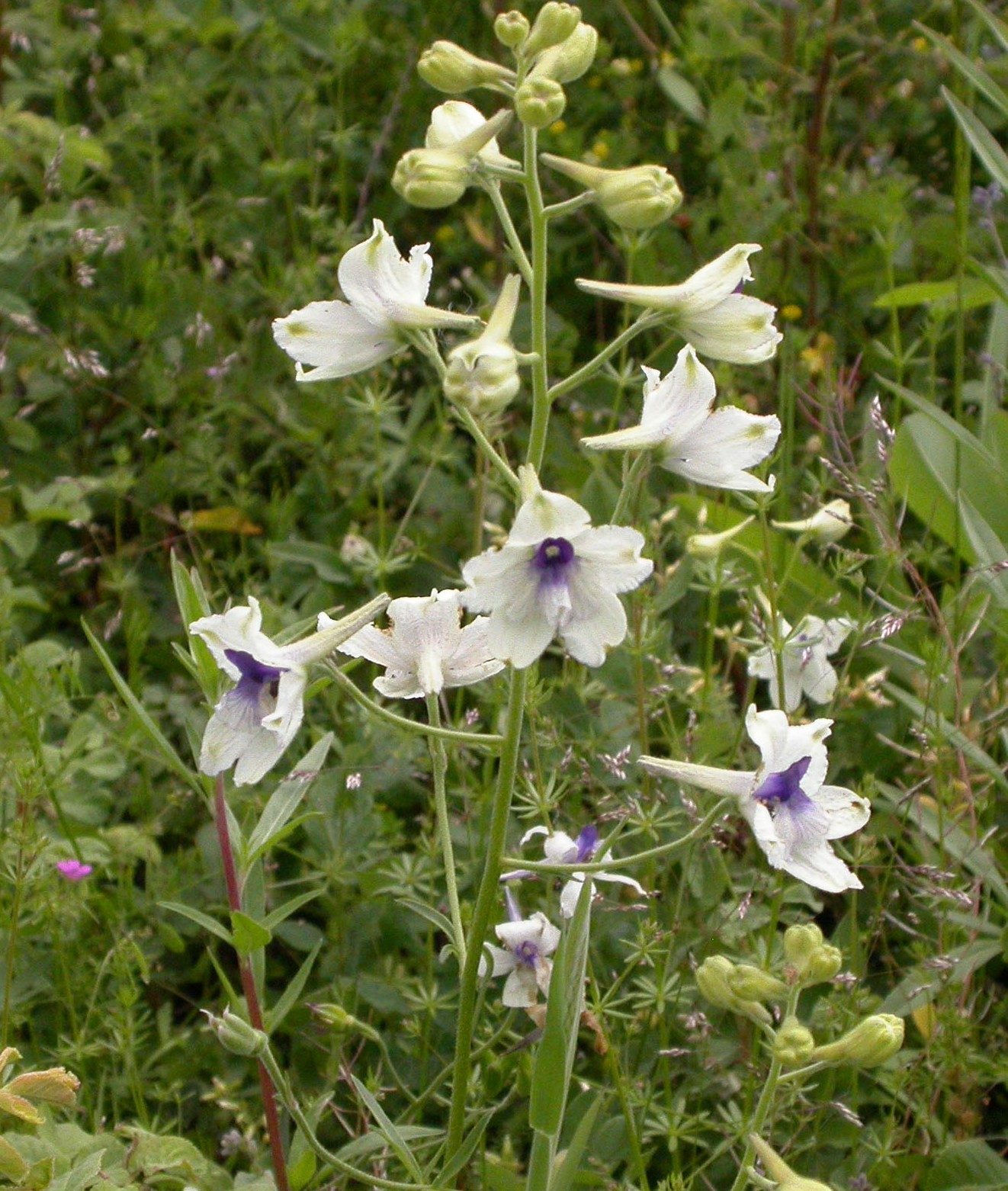

Scientific classification
- Kingdom: Plantae
- Clade: Tracheophytes
- Clade: Angiosperms
- Clade: Eudicots
- Order: Ranunculales
- Family: Ranunculaceae
- Genus: Delphinium
- Species: D. pavonaceum

Binomial name
- Delphinium pavonaceum Ewan

= Delphinium pavonaceum =

Species of flowering plant

Delphinium pavonaceum (syn. Delphinium × pavonaceum) is a species of flowering plant in the buttercup family known by the common name peacock larkspur. It is endemic to Oregon in the United States, where it is limited to the Willamette Valley.

== Description ==
This larkspur has white sepals and blue upper petals. It is likely a hybrid between Delphinium menziesii and D. trolliifolium. It grows up to 90 centimeters tall from a network of tubers. The inflorescence is pyramidal, with the lower pedicels much longer than the upper. Flowering occurs in April through June. Flowers are pollinated by bumblebees. Associated plants include Potentilla gracilis, Deschampsia cespitosa, Poa pratensis, Rosa spp., Spiraea douglasii, Rubus spp., Rhus diversiloba, and Fraxinus latifolia.

== Distribution and habitat ==
This plant grows on prairies and floodplains, in well-drained areas. It is endemic to the Willamette Valley in Oregon.

== Conservation ==
Threats to the species include loss of habitat to urban development and agriculture, as well as herbicides and hybridization.
