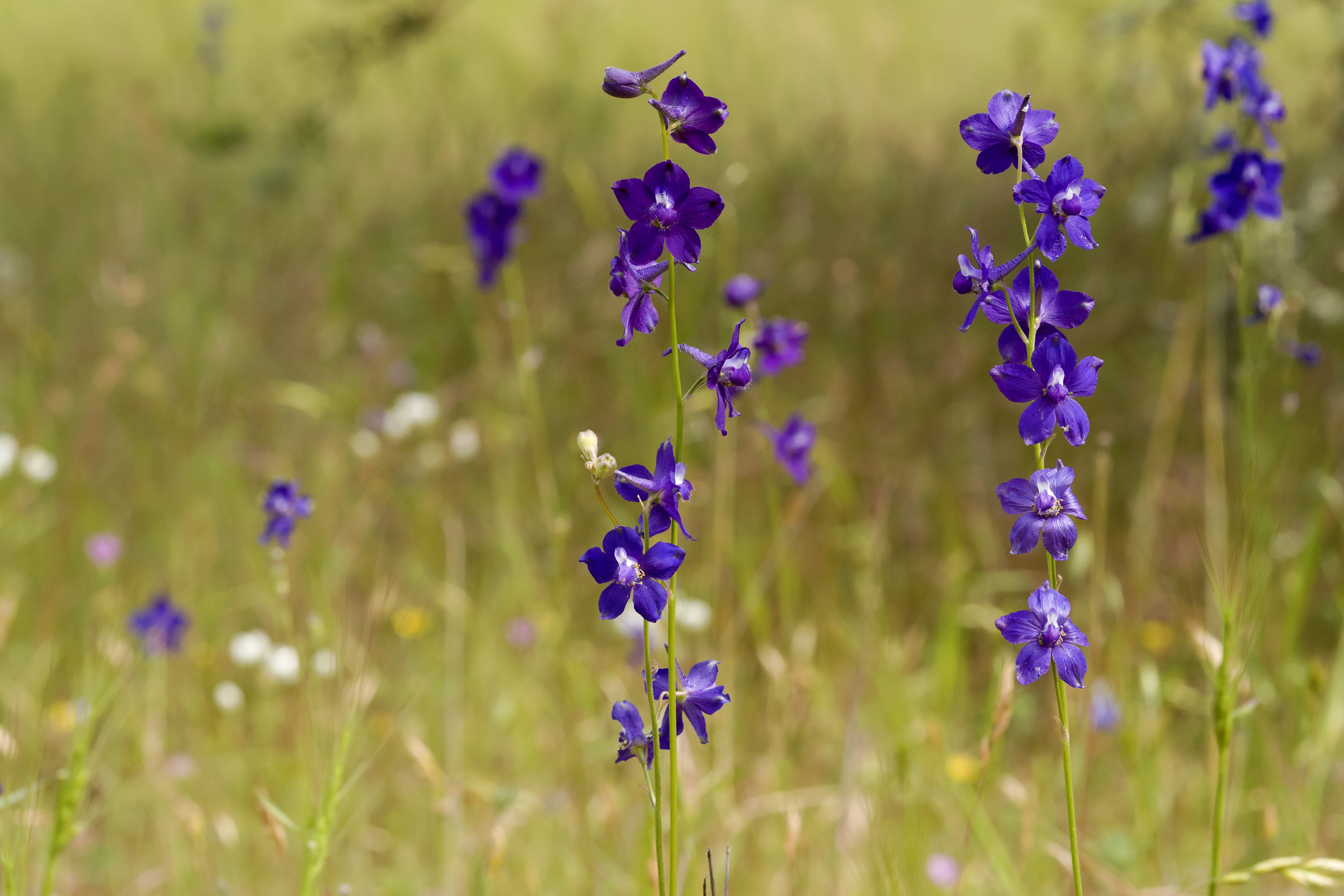

Conservation status
- Apparently Secure (NatureServe)

Scientific classification
- Kingdom: Plantae
- Clade: Tracheophytes
- Clade: Angiosperms
- Clade: Eudicots
- Order: Ranunculales
- Family: Ranunculaceae
- Genus: Delphinium
- Species: D. hansenii

Binomial name
- Delphinium hansenii Greene

= Delphinium hansenii =

Species of flowering plant

Delphinium hansenii is a species of larkspur known by the common names Eldorado larkspur and Hansen's delphinium. It is endemic to California, where it grows in mountains, valleys, and desert from the southern Cascade Range to the Mojave Desert.

== Description ==
This wildflower usually grows between one half and one meter in height, although it can grow much taller. The deeply lobed leaves are hairy, especially on the undersides. The inflorescence has usually over 25 flowers grouped close together at the top of the stem and held on long pedicels. The flowers are white to light blue or light pink, or bicolored, and vary in size. The inner petals may be quite hairy. The flowering time is between the months of March and May. It has a chromosome number of 2n=32, which means that the total number of chromosomes in diploid cells is 32. The fruit type is a follicle. It is a perennial herb.

It could be confused with Delphinium hesperium, but is it easily identifiable by the unique seeds of the Eldorado larkspur. The seeds are unique among members of its genus, bearing many prism-like raised structures. Most other species can also be distinguished from D. hansenii from its seeds.
