= Sigma Eta Chi =

American Congregational college sorority

- ΣΗΧ
- Founded: May 1, 1923; 102 years ago Ohio State University
- Type: Social
- Affiliation: Independent
- Status: Defunct
- Defunct date: After 1958
- Emphasis: Christian; Congregational
- Scope: National (US)
- Colors: Azure blue and Silver
- Symbol: Candlestick
- Flower: Rose and Blue Larkspur
- Publication: Luchnokaia
- Chapters: 8
- Headquarters: United States

Sigma Eta Chi (ΣΗΧ) was an American collegiate sorority for Congregational women. It was established in 1923 at Ohio State University in Columbus, Ohio and ceased operating after 1958.

== History ==
On May 1, 1923, fourteen female students chartered a sorority for Congregational women at Ohio State University in Columbus, Ohio. The purpose of the sorority was "to form a social unit in which spiritual and intellectual development might advance in harmony". A second chapter, Beta, was formed at the University of Michigan in the spring of 1925.

The two chapters held a conference in 1926 to discuss becoming a national sorority. A national constitution was written and national officers were elected. A third chapter, Gamma, was formed at the University of Washington in 1927. Sigma Eta Chi held its first national convention in Columbus, Ohio, in June 1928.

The organization later would affiliate members of the Evangelical and Reformed churches, in addition to Congregational. Later, it became non-exclusive concerning membership, allowing members of other sororities to join.

The sorority continued at least into the middle of the 20th century, though the final date of dissolution is unknown. A chapter in Ames, Iowa was meeting in 1948. The University of Nebraska Cornhusker Yearbook of 1958 lists the president of the sorority. The records of the University of Northern Iowa indicate that Sigma Eta Chi was classified as a Congregational sorority well into the 1950s. The Kansas State Royal Purple Yearbook of 1948 notes the growth of its chapter. However, in the early 1970s, a group with the same name emerged as a service sorority.

== Symbols ==
The Sigma Eta Chi badge was a rectangular octagon with a blue enamel background for candlestick with a ruby flame and the Greek letters ΣΗΧ placed vertically to the right. The badge was surrounded by blue stones set in white or yellow gold. The sorority's pledge pin was a silver candlestick with a lit candle.

The sorority's colors were azure blue and silver. Its flowers were the rose and blue larkspur. Its publication was the Luchnokaia.

Sorority members held a special ceremony called Luchnokaia that took place during a Sunday in Lent. Each member lit a candle from seven candles, the seven representing the seven "great guiding lights" of Christianity. Each member left the church "pledging to live a more consecrated life".

== Chapters ==
The sorority grew to include six chapters by 1930, with possibly two more by the late 1950s.

Chapter	Charter date and range	Institution	Location	Status	Ref.
Alpha	May 1, 1923 – 19xx ?	Ohio State University	Columbus, Ohio	Inactive	
Beta	1925–19xx ?	University of Michigan	Ann Arbor, Michigan	Inactive	
Gamma	1927–19xx ?	University of Washington	Seattle, Washington	Inactive	
Delta	1928–19xx ?	University of Kansas	Lawrence, Kansas	Inactive	
Epsilon	1928– > 1953 ?	University of Nebraska	Lincoln, Nebraska	Inactive	
Zeta	1928–19xx ?	Oregon State University	Corvallis, Oregon	Inactive	
	19xx ?–1945	Iowa State University	Ames, Iowa	Inactive	
	19xx ?– > 1974	University of Northern Iowa	Cedar Falls, Iowa	Inactive	
Iota	1944 - > 1954	Kansas State University	Manhattan, Kansas	Inactive	
