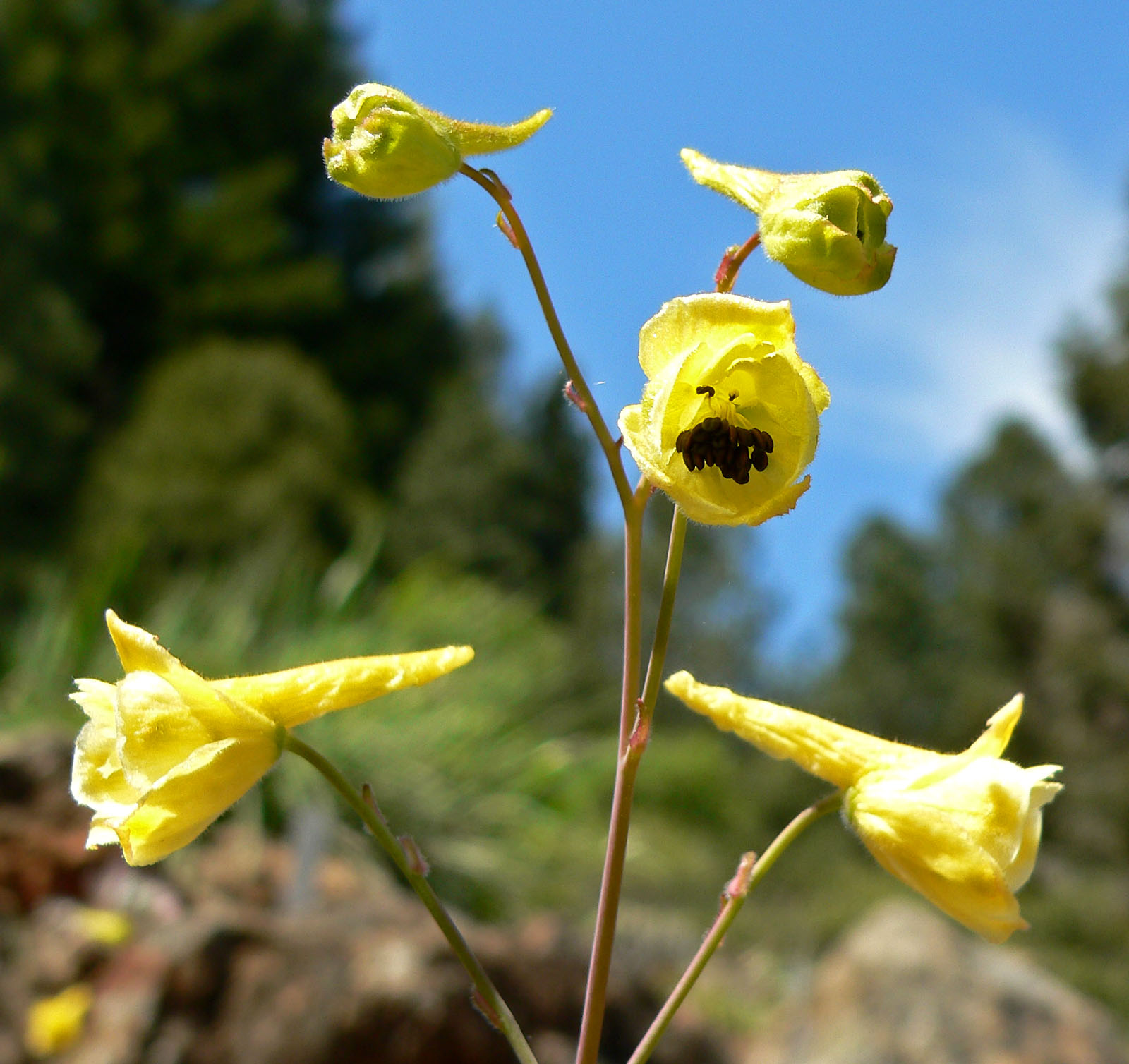

Conservation status
- Endangered (ESA)

Scientific classification
- Kingdom: Plantae
- Clade: Tracheophytes
- Clade: Angiosperms
- Clade: Eudicots
- Order: Ranunculales
- Family: Ranunculaceae
- Genus: Delphinium
- Species: D. luteum

Binomial name
- Delphinium luteum Heller

= Delphinium luteum =

Species of flowering plant

Delphinium luteum, known by the common name yellow larkspur, is a species of small perennial herb in the buttercup family bearing bright yellow cornucopia-shaped flowers. Endemic to the rocky, foggy hillsides of coastal Sonoma County, California, it is critically endangered, with about 200 individuals believed to be in existence as of 2005.

The plant was never distributed beyond the coastal area of Sonoma and Marin counties, and has never been abundant. Activities in the area including quarrying, grazing, agriculture, and development further reduced the population of yellow larkspur to its current near-extinction. It has been listed as an endangered species since the 1970s. Extremely isolated patches of the plant still exist on private property near Bodega Bay, where it is protected.

Yellow larkspur is pollinated by hummingbirds and insects, and often hybridizes with two other Delphinium species if it receives their pollen. However, pure unhybridized individuals of yellow larkspur exist and the genetic diversity within the species is high. Recent conservation attempts have focused on specifically preserving yellow larkspur's genetic identity. A closely related flower native to the same region, Baker's larkspur, is also critically endangered, and the two species are often studied together.
