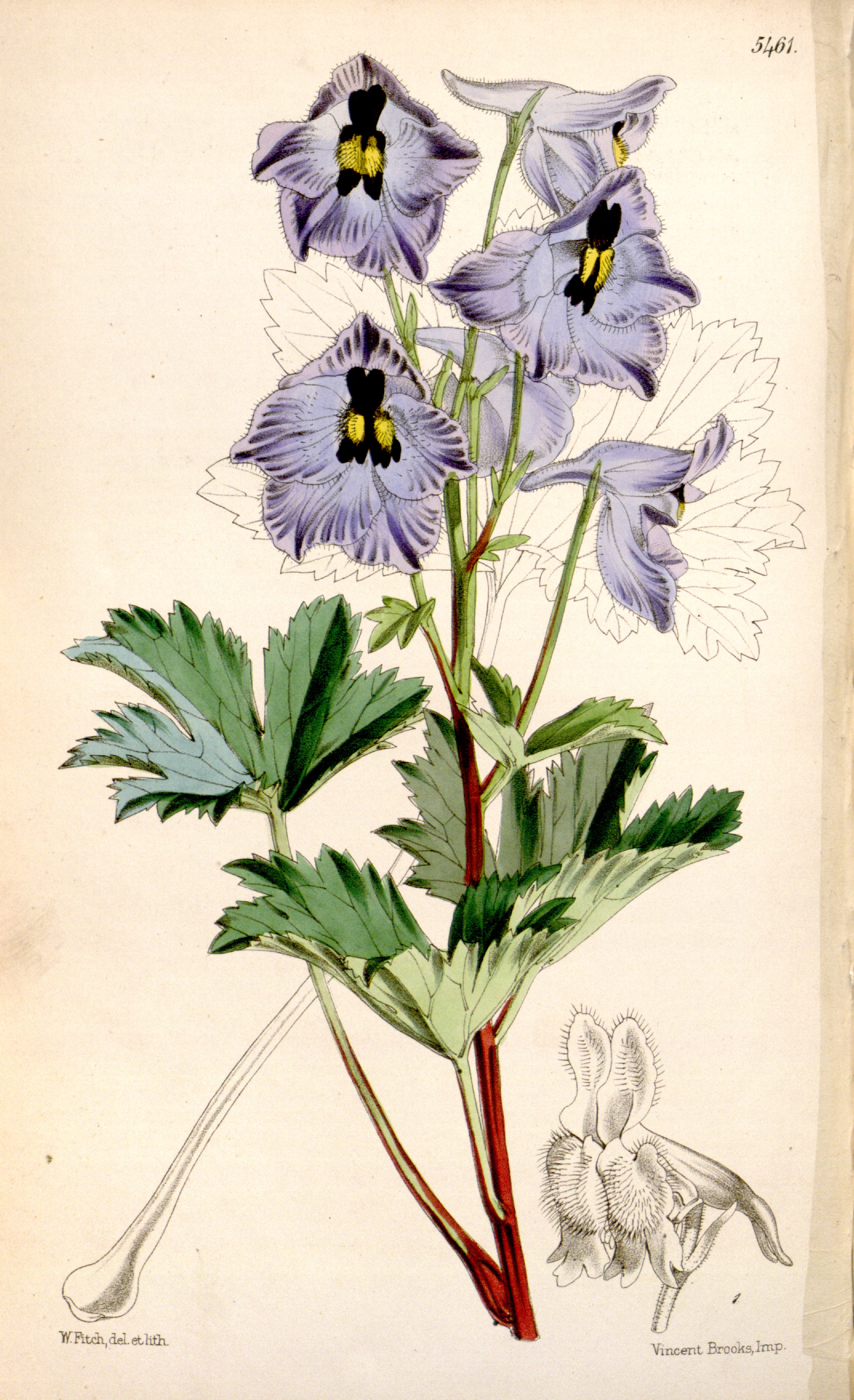

Scientific classification
- Kingdom: Plantae
- Clade: Tracheophytes
- Clade: Angiosperms
- Clade: Eudicots
- Order: Ranunculales
- Family: Ranunculaceae
- Genus: Delphinium
- Species: D. brunonianum

Binomial name
- Delphinium brunonianum Royle

Synonyms
- Delphinium brunonianum var. aitchisonii Huth; Delphinium brunonianum var. jacquemontianum (Cambess.) Huth; Delphinium brunonianum var. schlagintweitii Huth; Delphinium jacquemontianum Cambess.; Delphinium minjanense Rech.f.; Delphinium moschatum Munro ex Hook.f. & Thomson

= Delphinium brunonianum =

Species of flowering plant

Delphinium brunonianum, common name musk larkspur, is a species of larkspur belonging to the family Ranunculaceae.

== Description ==
Delphinium brunonianum can reach a height of 10–25 centimetres (3.9–9.8 in). It has a strong musky smell (hence the common name). The leaves are palmately lobed, petiolate and alternate. This plant produces racemes with 5 - 10 blue to purple cup-shaped flowers. Tepals have slender white hairs on both sides and spurs are short. They bloom from July to September.

== Distribution ==
This species is native to Central Asia, Afghanistan, Pakistan, Tibet and the Himalaya.

== Habitat ==
It can be found in stony mountain slopes and screes at elevation of 4,300–5,500 metres (14,100–18,000 ft) above sea level.
