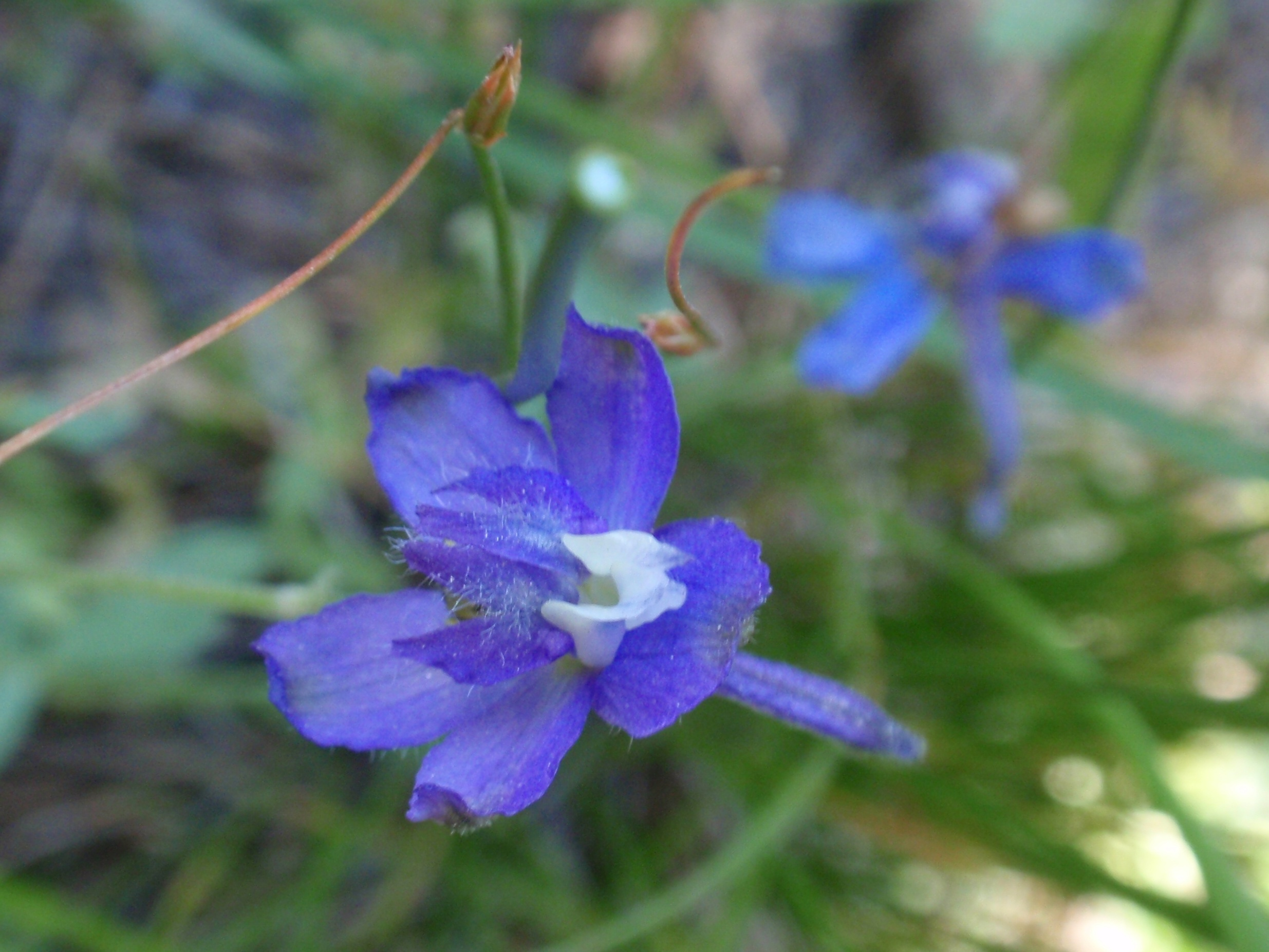

Scientific classification
- Kingdom: Plantae
- Clade: Tracheophytes
- Clade: Angiosperms
- Clade: Eudicots
- Order: Ranunculales
- Family: Ranunculaceae
- Genus: Delphinium
- Species: D. depauperatum

Binomial name
- Delphinium depauperatum Nutt.

Synonyms
- Delphinium cyanoreios Delphinium diversifolium

= Delphinium depauperatum =

Species of flowering plant

Delphinium depauperatum is a species of larkspur known by the common names slim larkspur and dwarf larkspur. This wildflower is native to western North America where it is found in mountain meadows. It grows from a short root and erects a stem usually under 40 centimeters in maximum height. The small leaves are divided into lobes and are usually located about the base of the plant. Toward the top of the stem are flowers on long pedicels, with usually not more than 20 flowers per plant. The flowers generally have deep dark blue sepals which are flat and extended to the sides, and petals which are mainly the same color except for the top two, which may be lighter blue to white. The spur is between one and two centimeters long.
