= Delphinium inopinum =

Scientific classification
- Kingdom: Plantae
- Clade: Tracheophytes
- Clade: Angiosperms
- Clade: Eudicots
- Order: Ranunculales
- Family: Ranunculaceae
- Genus: Delphinium
- Species: D. inopinum

Binomial name
- Delphinium inopinum (Jeps.) F.H.Lewis & Epling

Species of flowering plant

Delphinium inopinum is a species of larkspur known by the common name unexpected larkspur. It is endemic to the Sierra Nevada of California, where it is known mostly from rocky areas in open temperate coniferous forest habitat.

== Description ==
Delphinium inopinum is a perennial herb with one or more erect, waxy stems usually exceeding a meter in height. The leaves are located mainly toward the base of the stem, with the upper part occupied by a raceme of at least 25 flowers. Each flower is held on a pedicel up to 2.5 centimeters long. The flower has white to light blue sepals each about a centimeter long which generally roll up and extend forward, with a spur about a centimeter long extending back. The fruit is up to 2 centimeters long.
