= Delphinium robustum =

Conservation status
- Imperiled (NatureServe)

Scientific classification
- Kingdom: Plantae
- Clade: Embryophytes
- Clade: Tracheophytes
- Clade: Angiosperms
- Clade: Eudicots
- Order: Ranunculales
- Family: Ranunculaceae
- Genus: Delphinium
- Species: D. robustum

Binomial name
- Delphinium robustum Rydb.

Species of flowering plant

Delphinium robustum is a species of flowering plant in the buttercup family known by the common names Wahatoya Creek larkspur and robust larkspur. It is native to Colorado and New Mexico in the United States.

This species is a perennial herb with stems growing up to about 2 meters tall, or sometimes taller. It is known to exceed 3 meters tall at times. The stems are hairless, waxy, and sometimes red in color near the base. The leaves have rounded lobed blades borne on long petioles. The inflorescence is a raceme that sometimes branches, becoming a panicle. It can contain up to 180 flowers. The flower has blue, purple-blue, lavender, or sometimes pink sepals. The petals have sparse yellow or white hairs. The fruit is between 1 and 2 centimeters long. Flowering occurs in July through September.

This plant grows in riparian woodlands and subalpine meadows. It can be found in canyon bottoms, aspen groves, and open woods.

Threats to this species are not clear because little is known about the plant. There are a number of potential threats, including road-related disturbances such as motorized vehicles, erosion, and road construction.
