= Delphinium hutchinsoniae =

Conservation status
- Imperiled (NatureServe)

Scientific classification
- Kingdom: Plantae
- Clade: Tracheophytes
- Clade: Angiosperms
- Clade: Eudicots
- Order: Ranunculales
- Family: Ranunculaceae
- Genus: Delphinium
- Species: D. hutchinsoniae

Binomial name
- Delphinium hutchinsoniae Ewan

Species of flowering plant

Delphinium hutchinsoniae is a rare species of larkspur known by the common names Monterey larkspur and Hutchinson's larkspur.

== Description ==
Delphinium hutchinsoniae is a perennial herb and grows up to 1 m (3.3 ft) in height. The leaves are divided into lobes which are further divided into smaller lobes, and they are mostly located low on the plant. The top of the thin, erect stem is occupied by an inflorescence of not more than ten flowers. Each flower has sepals which are brilliant purple or blue to lavender, two petals which are the same color, and two upper petals which are usually white. The spur is up to two centimeters long and curves down at the tip.

== Distribution and habitat ==
It is endemic to California, where it is known only from Monterey County. Its habitat includes coastal chaparral and clearings in coniferous woods.

== Conservation ==
As of April 2026, NatureServe listed Delphinium hutchinsoniae as Imperiled (G2). This status was last reviewed in 3 August 2016. It is threatened by development, grazing, roads, erosion, trampling, and exotic weeds.
