= Delphinium decorum =

Scientific classification
- Kingdom: Plantae
- Clade: Tracheophytes
- Clade: Angiosperms
- Clade: Eudicots
- Order: Ranunculales
- Family: Ranunculaceae
- Genus: Delphinium
- Species: D. decorum

Binomial name
- Delphinium decorum Fisch. & C.A. Mey.

Species of flowering plant

Delphinium decorum is a species of larkspur known by the common names coastal larkspur and yellow-tinge larkspur. This wildflower is native to California and Oregon, where it grows on the slopes of the coastal ranges from the San Francisco Bay Area north to the southern Oregon coast. It has an erect stem which approaches half a meter in height at maximum. The leaves, which are divided into a number of narrow lobes, are mostly located about the base of the plant. The spindly stem above bears two to twenty widely spaced flowers. Each flower is carried on a pedicel several centimeters long. The five long, flat sepals are extended to give the face of the flower a star shape, and they are usually deep blue to purple. The petals are similar in color, except the top two may be lighter to almost white. The spur is very thin and may be nearly two centimeters long.
