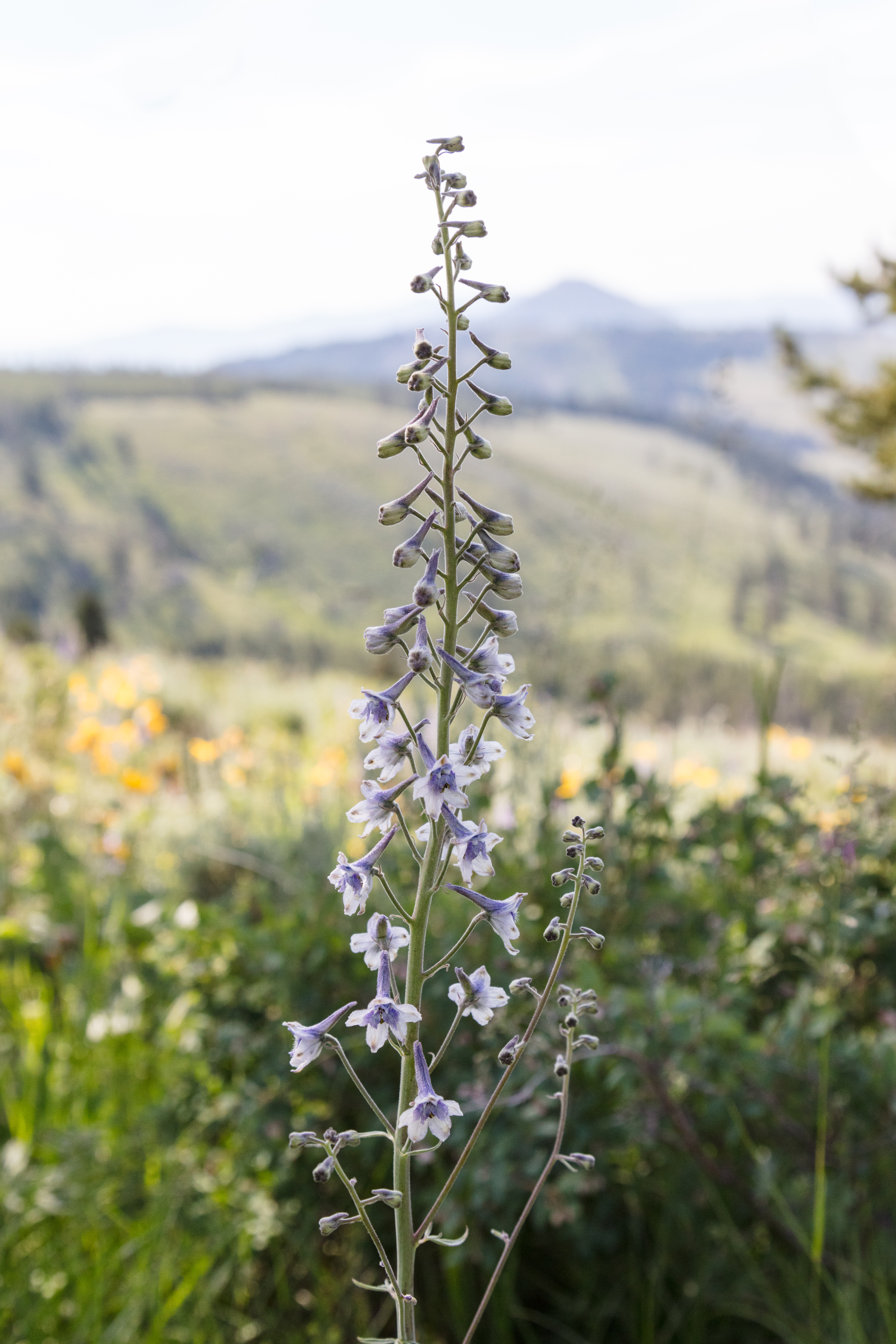
- In Yellowstone National Park

Scientific classification
- Kingdom: Plantae
- Clade: Embryophytes
- Clade: Tracheophytes
- Clade: Spermatophytes
- Clade: Angiosperms
- Clade: Eudicots
- Order: Ranunculales
- Family: Ranunculaceae
- Genus: Delphinium
- Species: D. occidentale

Binomial name
- Delphinium occidentale (S.Watson) S.Watson ex Coult.

= Delphinium occidentale =

Species of flowering plant

Delphinium occidentale, the western larkspur, is a perennial plant in the buttercup family (Ranunculaceae) with purple flowers. It grows along streambanks and moist areas of the Great Basin in Nevada and Utah.

There are usually between few and several stems, which can grow up to about 1.83 metres (6 ft). There are racemes of many small flowers at the ends of branches, ranging from dark blue to white. The leaves are large and palmate.

The most widespread tall larkspur, it is also very poisonous. It is also known by the common name duncecap larkspur.
