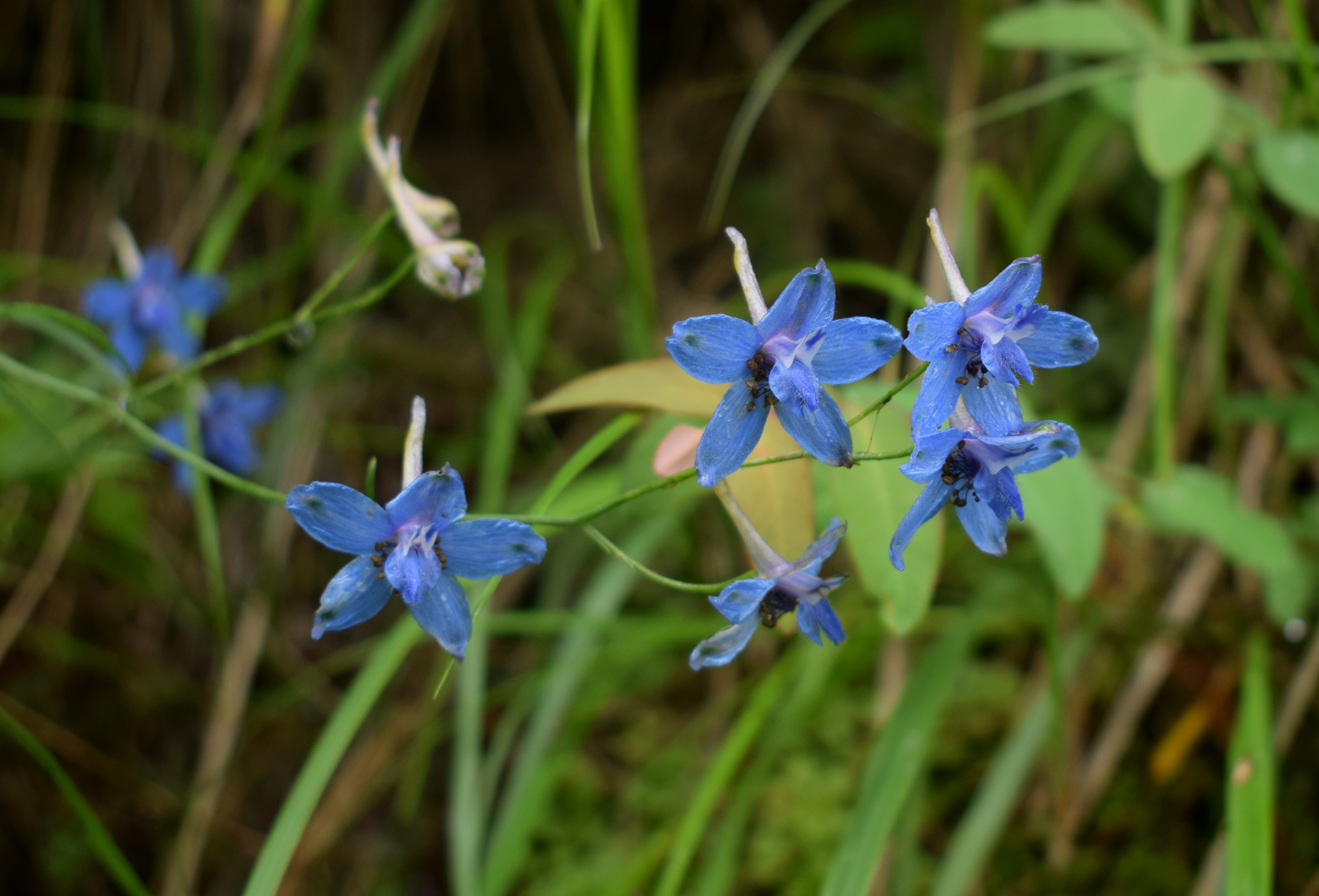

Scientific classification
- Kingdom: Plantae
- Clade: Tracheophytes
- Clade: Angiosperms
- Clade: Eudicots
- Order: Ranunculales
- Family: Ranunculaceae
- Genus: Delphinium
- Species: D. denudatum

Binomial name
- Delphinium denudatum Wall. ex Hook.f. & Thomson

= Delphinium denudatum =

Species of plant

Delphinium denudatum is a species of wildflower in the genus Delphinium, native to Central Asia.

== Distribution ==
Delphinium denudatum is found on the outer ranges of western Himalayas of Nepal and in India from Kashmir to Kumaon at a height between 8000 and 12000 feet above sea level.

== Medicinal properties ==
It is one of the important drugs used as indigenous medicine in India, especially in Unani medicine. Its vernacular name is Jadwar.

The roots of the plant are reported to be useful in a variety of ailments such as aconite poisoning, brain diseases, fungal infection, piles and toothache as analgesic and astringent. A number of studies have been done on its phytochemical and pharmacological properties.

Its use in opium addiction is mentioned in some classical literature, which has been verified and validated in morphine-induced physical dependent de-addiction studies. Some species are reported to have been poisonous.
