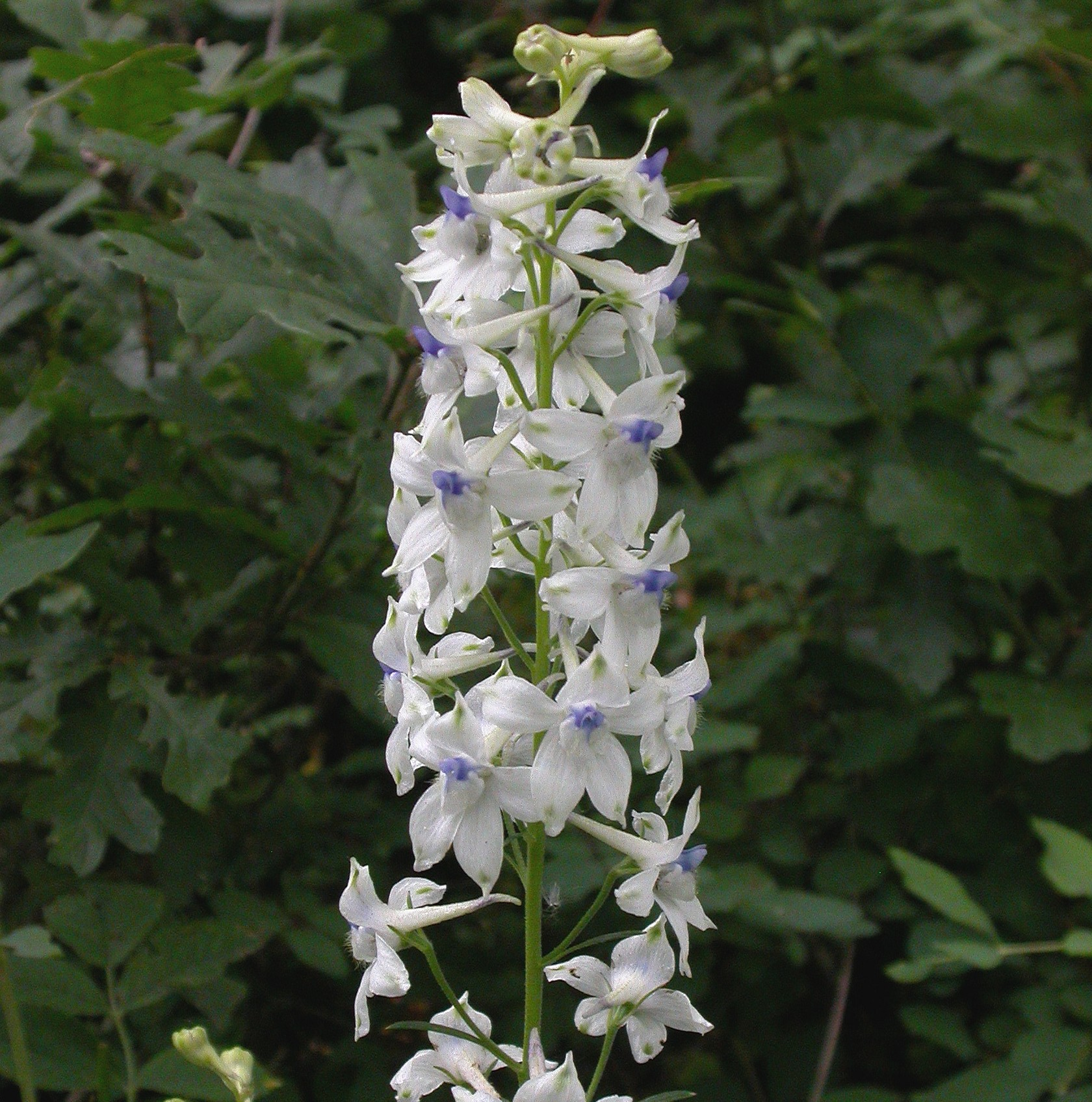

Scientific classification
- Kingdom: Plantae
- Clade: Tracheophytes
- Clade: Angiosperms
- Clade: Eudicots
- Order: Ranunculales
- Family: Ranunculaceae
- Genus: Delphinium
- Species: D. leucophaeum

Binomial name
- Delphinium leucophaeum Greene

= Delphinium leucophaeum =

Species of flowering plant

Delphinium leucophaeum is an endangered species of larkspur known by the common name white rock larkspur or pale larkspur. It is endemic to the Willamette Valley of Oregon. Some consider it to be a synonym for or variety of Delphinium nuttallii.
