= Delphinium purpusii =

Scientific classification
- Kingdom: Plantae
- Clade: Tracheophytes
- Clade: Angiosperms
- Clade: Eudicots
- Order: Ranunculales
- Family: Ranunculaceae
- Genus: Delphinium
- Species: D. purpusii

Binomial name
- Delphinium purpusii Brandegee

Synonyms
- Delphinium roseum

Species of flowering plant

Delphinium purpusii is a rare species of larkspur known by the common names Kern County larkspur and rose-flowered larkspur. It is endemic to California where it is known only from Kern and Tulare Counties in the region where the Sierra Nevada meets the Mojave Desert. It grows on rocky cliffs and talus. This wildflower reaches between one half and one meter in height. The erect thin stem has deeply lobed leaves around the base and a small, narrow inflorescence of generally ten to 20 flowers at the top. The flowers of this species are bright pink, making it unusual among the mainly blue-flowered plants of this genus. The sepals curl either forward or back.
