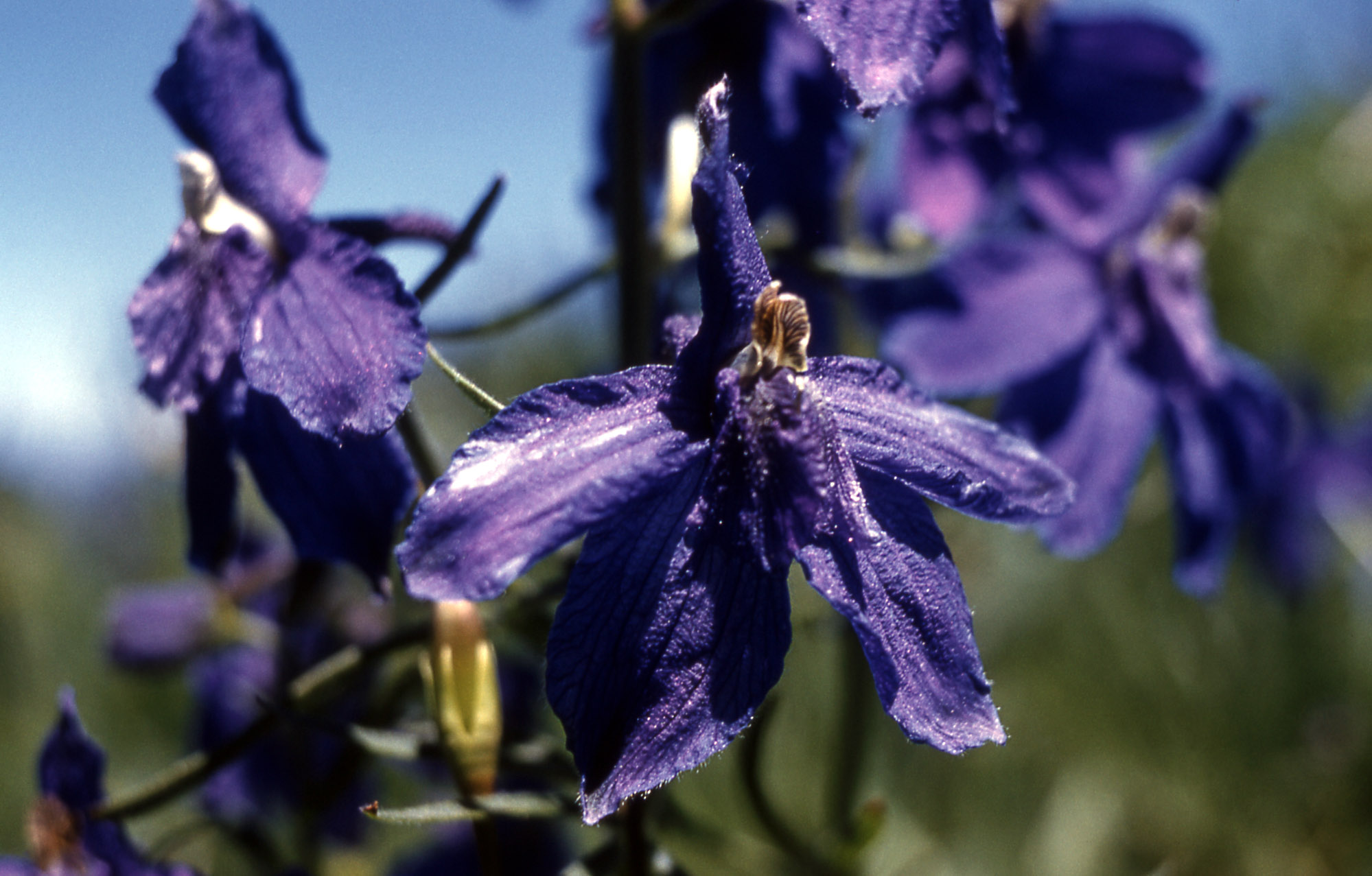

Scientific classification
- Kingdom: Plantae
- Clade: Tracheophytes
- Clade: Angiosperms
- Clade: Eudicots
- Order: Ranunculales
- Family: Ranunculaceae
- Genus: Delphinium
- Species: D. bicolor

Binomial name
- Delphinium bicolor Nutt.

= Delphinium bicolor =

Species of flowering plant

Delphinium bicolour is a species of larkspur known as little larkspur and low larkspur. It is native to northwestern North America from British Columbia to South Dakota, where it grows in mountain forests and foothill scrub and prairie. This is a perennial herb growing from a thickly branching root system. It produces solitary stems to 40 centimetres (16 in) in height and green with reddish bases. Most of the leaves are low on the stem and grow on short petioles. They are several centimeters long with many rounded lobes. The small inflorescence holds a few large flowers per stem. The flower has dark purple-blue sepals each about 2 centimeters long and a spur of 1 to 2 centimeters. The plant is poisonous to cattle, less so to sheep, and it is occasionally eaten by various species of wild cervids.
