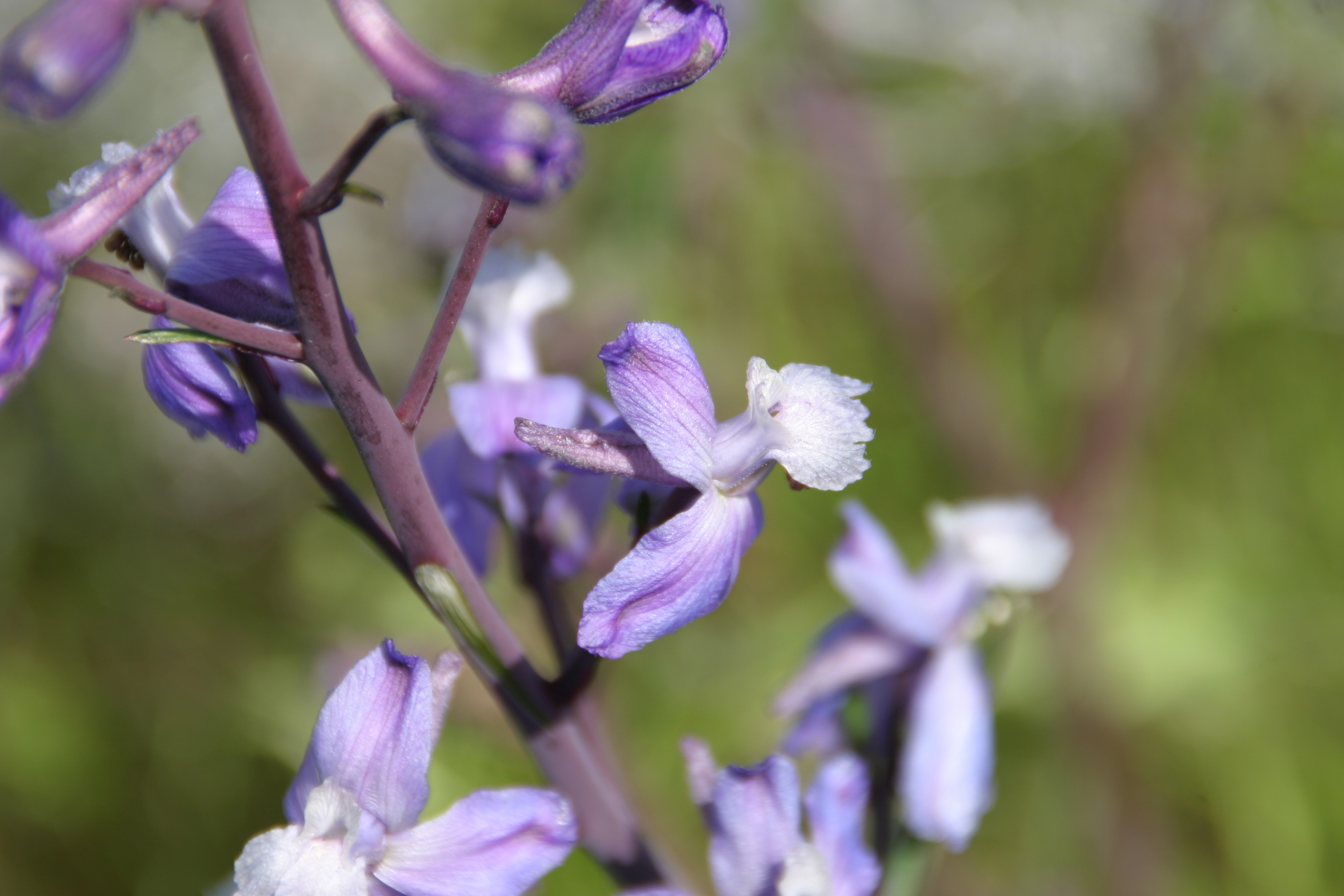

Conservation status
- Imperiled (NatureServe)

Scientific classification
- Kingdom: Plantae
- Clade: Tracheophytes
- Clade: Angiosperms
- Clade: Eudicots
- Order: Ranunculales
- Family: Ranunculaceae
- Genus: Delphinium
- Species: D. recurvatum

Binomial name
- Delphinium recurvatum Greene

= Delphinium recurvatum =

Species of flowering plant

Delphinium recurvatum is a species of larkspur known by the common names Byron larkspur, recurved larkspur, and valley larkspur. It is endemic to California, where most of its historical range is in the Central Valley. The grasslands of the valley have been mostly claimed for development and agriculture, so this species is now uncommon. This wildflower reaches a maximum height of about half a meter. Its deeply lobed leaves are mainly basal, with those located further up the dark purple stem being much smaller. The flowers are generally blue, with the sepals and lower petals darker than the upper petals. The sepals are usually curved back, the trait which gives the plant its name.
