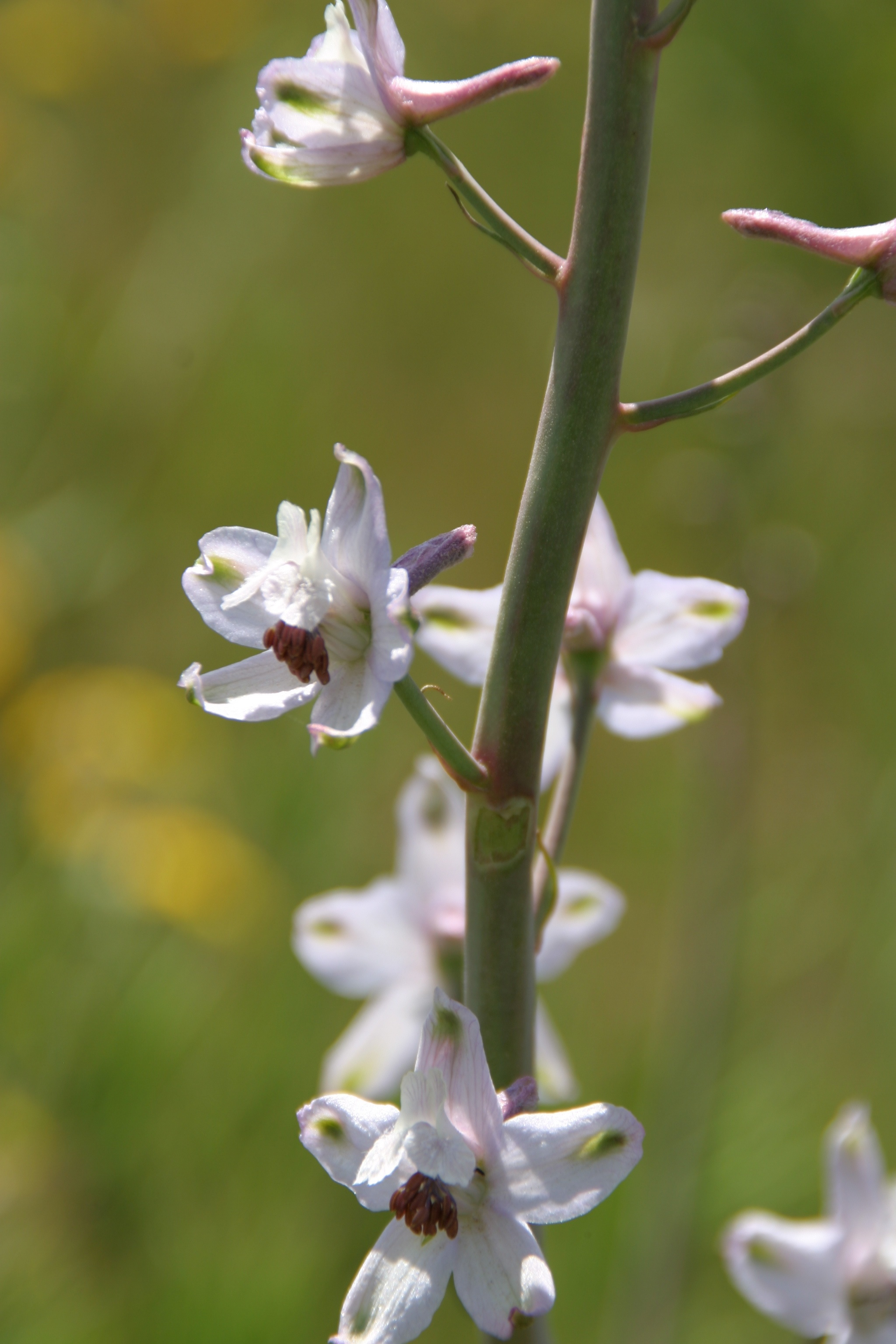
- subsp. gypsophilum

Scientific classification
- Kingdom: Plantae
- Clade: Tracheophytes
- Clade: Angiosperms
- Clade: Eudicots
- Order: Ranunculales
- Family: Ranunculaceae
- Genus: Delphinium
- Species: D. gypsophilum

Binomial name
- Delphinium gypsophilum Ewan

= Delphinium gypsophilum =

Species of flowering plant

Delphinium gypsophilum is a species of larkspur known by the common name gypsum-loving larkspur or Panoche Creek larkspur (frequently misspelled as Pinoche Creek larkspur). It is endemic to California, where it grows in low mountains in the central part of the state. This wildflower generally reaches between one half and one meter in height. Its pale whitish-green stem is topped with cylindrical inflorescences of up to 30 flowers on short pedicels. The flowers are pale blue or chalk-white; occasional individuals bear pink or light blue flowers. The spur is one to one and a half centimeters long.
