= Delphinium calthifolium =

Scientific classification
- Kingdom: Plantae
- Clade: Tracheophytes
- Clade: Angiosperms
- Clade: Eudicots
- Order: Ranunculales
- Family: Ranunculaceae
- Genus: Delphinium
- Species: D. calthifolium

Binomial name
- Delphinium calthifolium Q. E. Yang & Y. Luo

Species of flowering plant

Delphinium calthifolium, common name lu ti cao ye cui que hua, is a plant species endemic to Sichuan Province in China. It is known from only one location in forest at an elevation of about 2300 m.

Delphinium calthifolium is a perennial herb up to 40 cm tall with long white hairs. The plant generally has only 2 leaves, both cordate to round, sometimes slightly lobate, crenulate (scalloped) along the margins. Flowers are blue, about 3 cm long.
