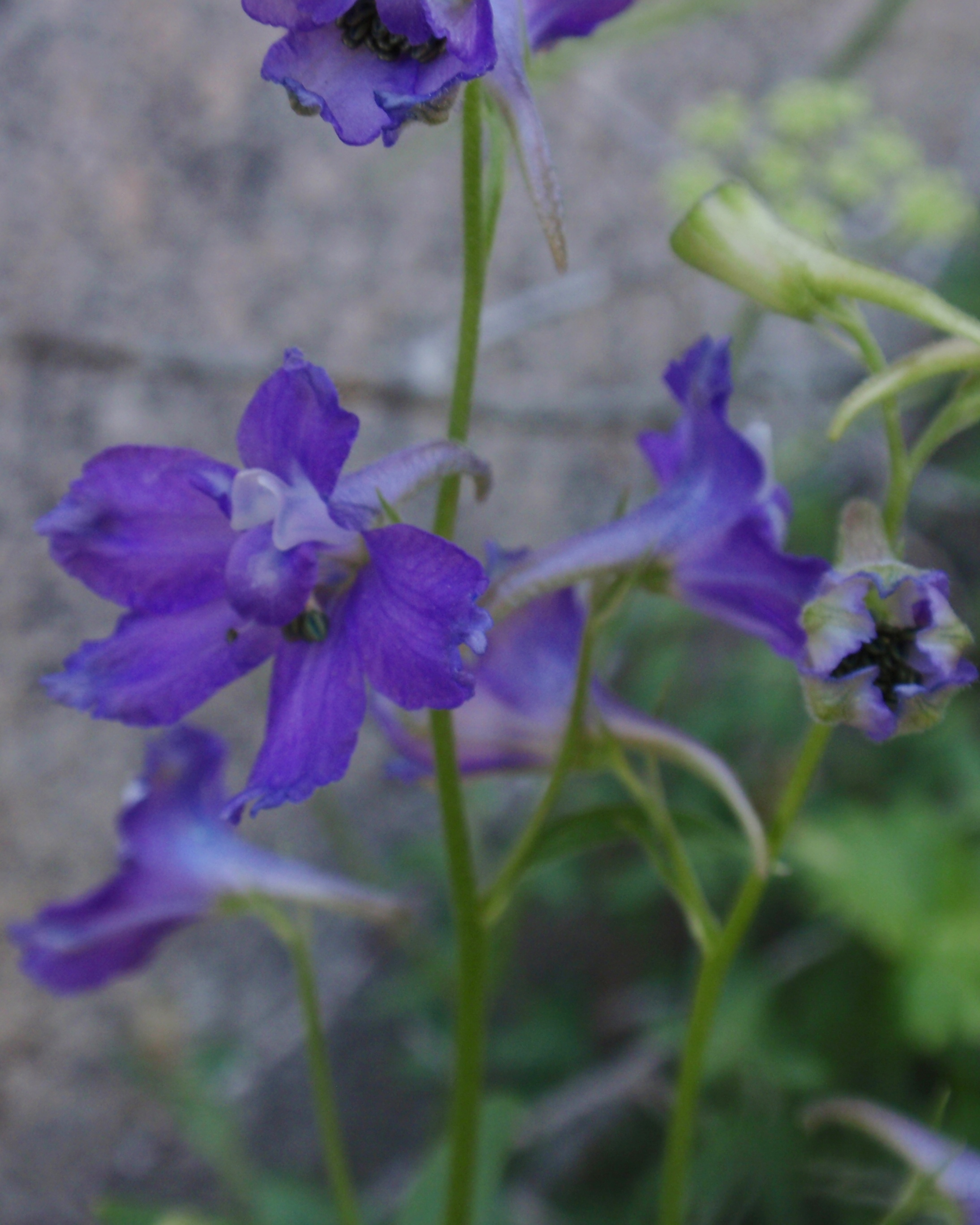

Conservation status
- Imperiled (NatureServe)

Scientific classification
- Kingdom: Plantae
- Clade: Tracheophytes
- Clade: Angiosperms
- Clade: Eudicots
- Order: Ranunculales
- Family: Ranunculaceae
- Genus: Delphinium
- Species: D. polycladon

Binomial name
- Delphinium polycladon Eastw.

= Delphinium polycladon =

Species of flowering plant

Delphinium polycladon is a species of larkspur known by the common name mountain marsh larkspur. It is native to the High Sierra Nevada and the White and Inyo Mountains of eastern California and far western Nevada, where it grows in wet sites in the talus. It is a perennial herb producing one or more erect stems which easily exceed a meter in height but often remain dwarfed in high-elevation, exposed habitat with thin soils. The leaves are small and mostly located near the base of the plant. The inflorescence is a raceme of up to 35 flowers on long, S-shaped pedicels, often arranged along one side of the stem. The sepals are deep blue to purple, one to two centimeters long, and with a spur up to 2 centimeters in length.
