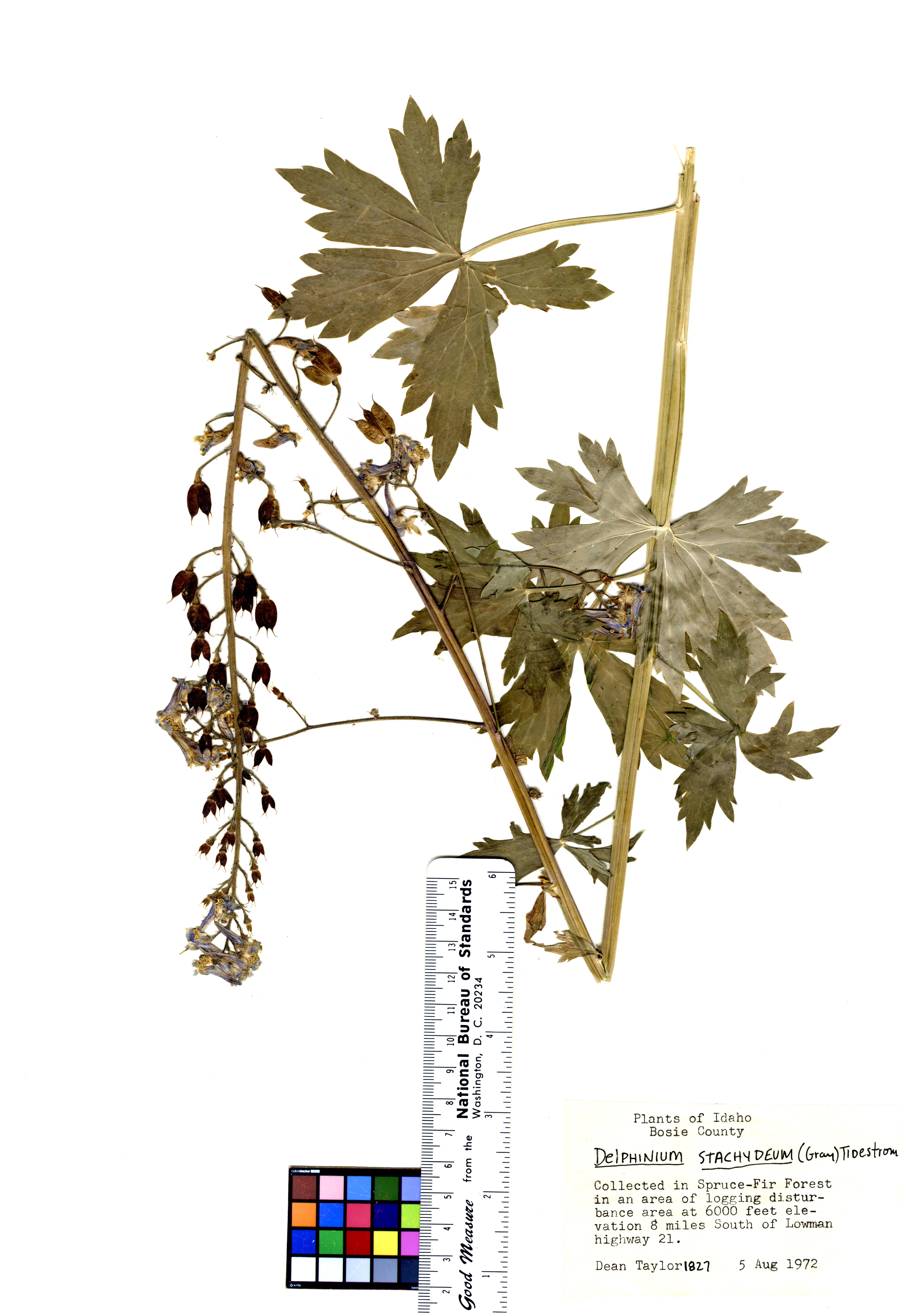

Scientific classification
- Kingdom: Plantae
- Clade: Tracheophytes
- Clade: Angiosperms
- Clade: Eudicots
- Order: Ranunculales
- Family: Ranunculaceae
- Genus: Delphinium
- Species: D. stachydeum

Binomial name
- Delphinium stachydeum (A.Gray) Tidestr.

= Delphinium stachydeum =

Species of flowering plant

Delphinium stachydeum is a species of larkspur known by the common name spiked larkspur. It is native to the Pacific Northwest and Great Basin of the United States, where it grows in sagebrush scrub and along the edges of mountain forest habitat where it meets prairie and plateau. It is a perennial herb producing at least one erect, slightly hairy stem generally exceeding a meter in height. The multilobed leaves are located mainly on the lower half of the stem except for the area just above ground level. The inflorescence is a branching array of usually more than 30 flowers, each held on a long pedicel. The flower has bright blue sepals around a centimeter long fringed with hairs and surrounding smaller, paler petals. The spur at the back of the flower is just over a centimeter in length.
