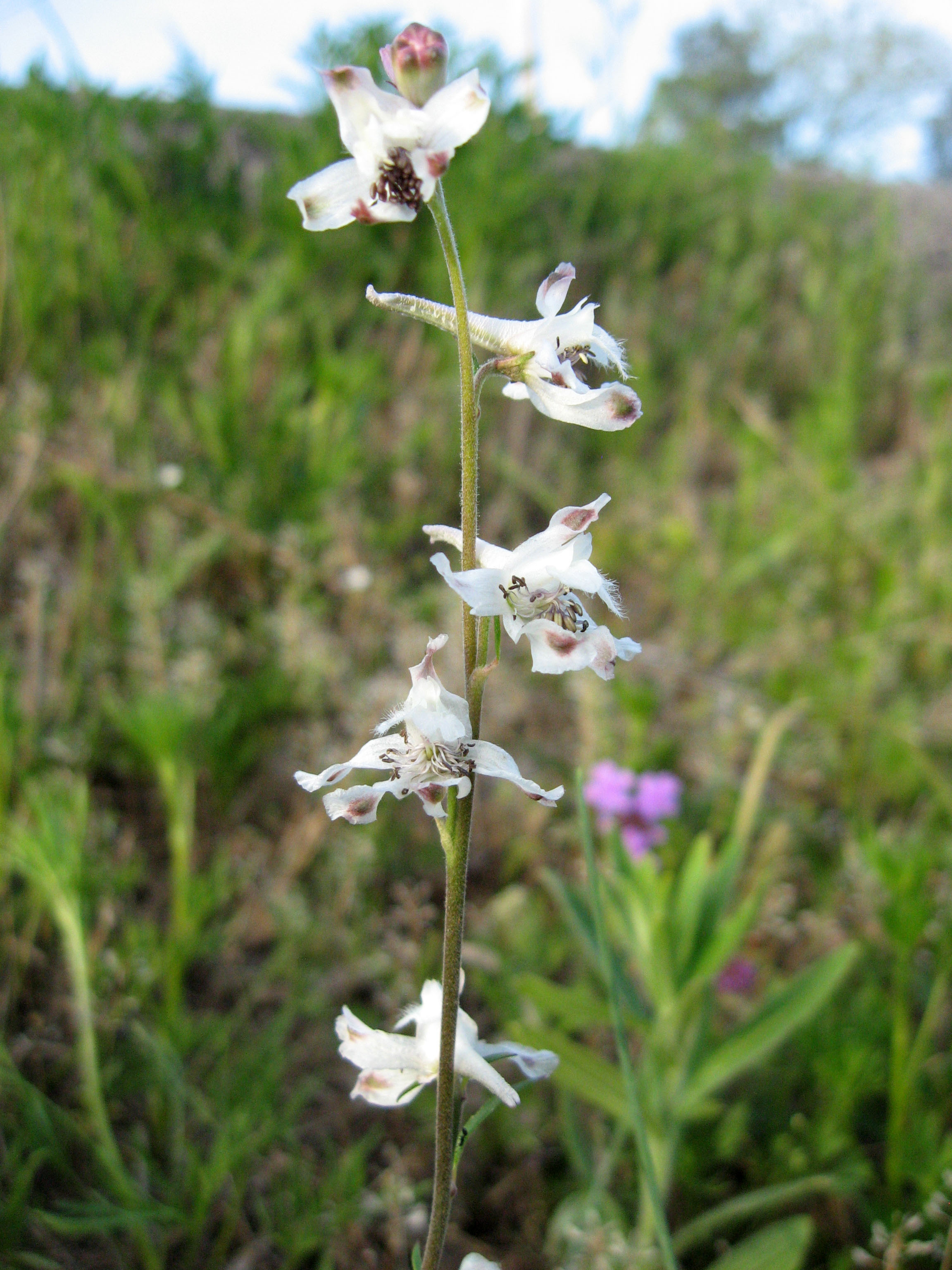
- Photo: Subspecies calciphilum

Conservation status
- Secure (NatureServe)

Scientific classification
- Kingdom: Plantae
- Clade: Tracheophytes
- Clade: Angiosperms
- Clade: Eudicots
- Order: Ranunculales
- Family: Ranunculaceae
- Genus: Delphinium
- Species: D. carolinianum

Binomial name
- Delphinium carolinianum Walter

= Delphinium carolinianum =

Species of flowering plant

Delphinium carolinianum (commonly known as Carolina larkspur, prairie larkspur, and blue larkspur) is a species of perennial flowering plant in the buttercup family. It is native to central and eastern North America, where it is found in prairies and rocky glades. It produces blue to white flowers in the spring.

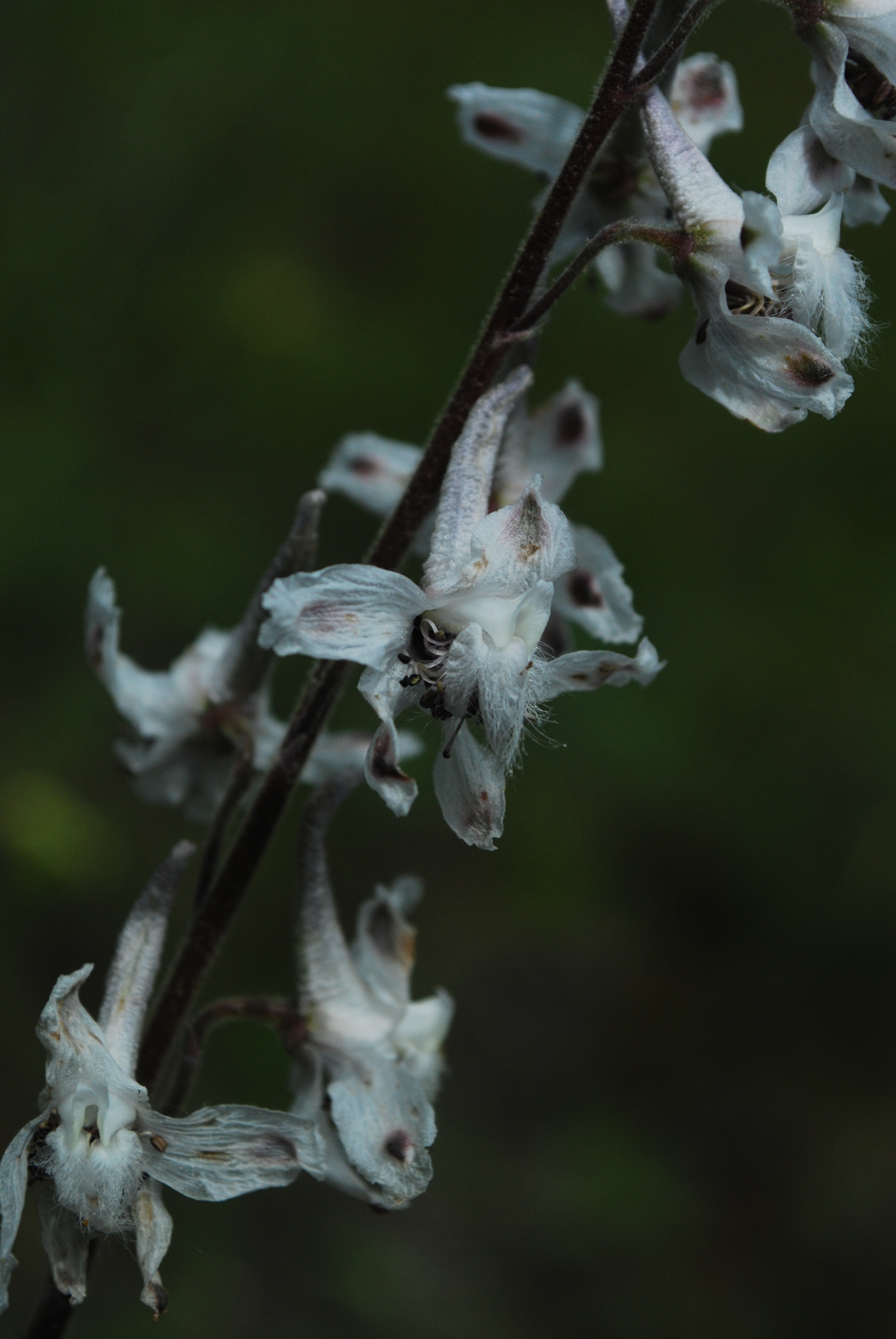
D. carolinianum ssp. virescens

Four subspecies have been named:

- Delphinium carolinianum var. calciphilum - Native to cedar glades of the Southeastern United States
- Delphinium carolinianum var. carolinianum - Widespread in central and eastern North America
- Delphinium carolinianum var. vimineum - Native to coastal areas of the United States and Mexico
- Delphinium carolinianum var. virescens - Native to the Central United States
