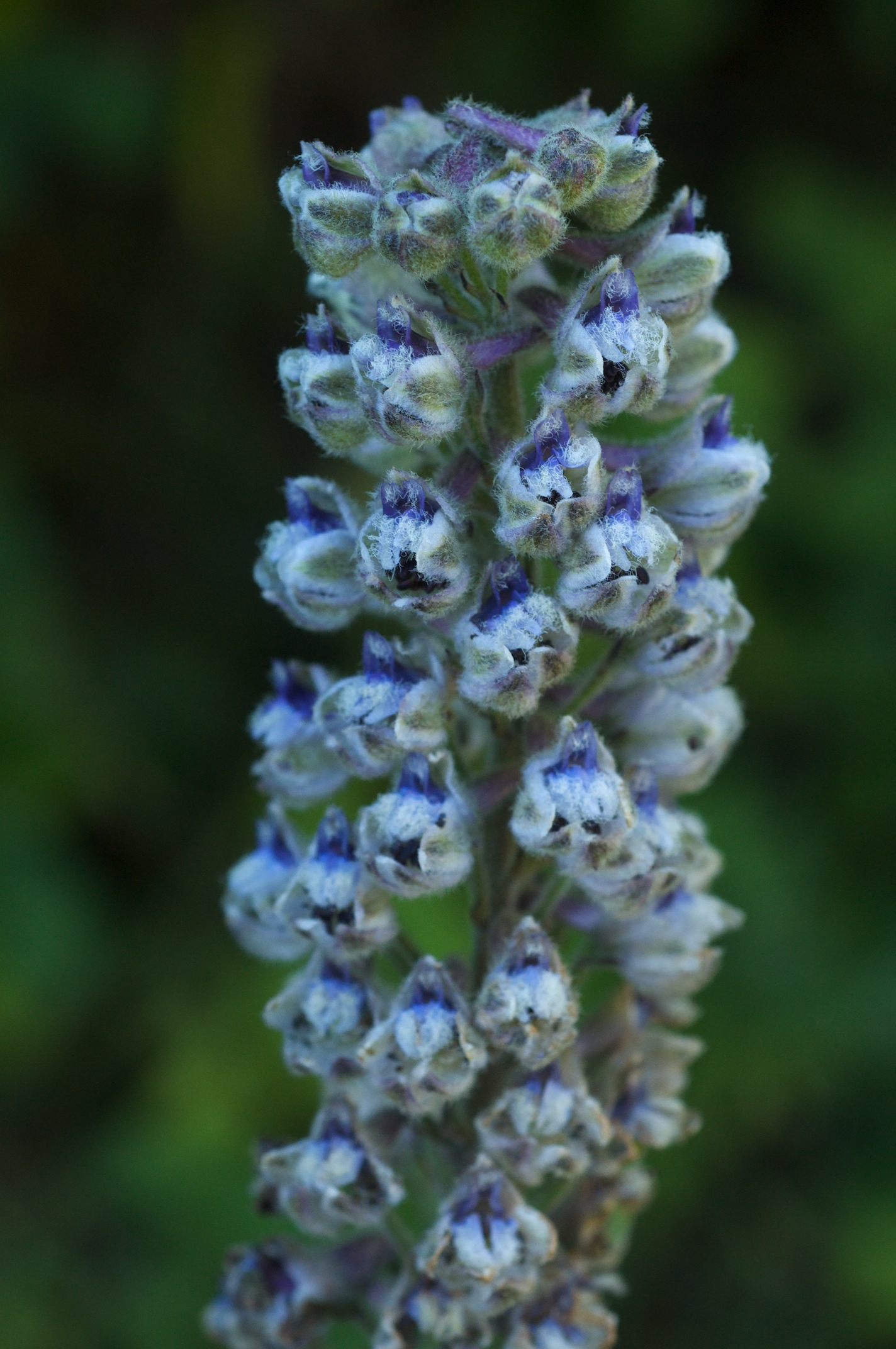

Scientific classification
- Kingdom: Plantae
- Clade: Tracheophytes
- Clade: Angiosperms
- Clade: Eudicots
- Order: Ranunculales
- Family: Ranunculaceae
- Genus: Delphinium
- Species: D. californicum

Binomial name
- Delphinium californicum Torr. & Gray

= Delphinium californicum =

Species of flowering plant

Delphinium californicum is a species of larkspur known as California larkspur. This wildflower is endemic to California, where it is a resident of the chaparral slopes of the San Francisco Bay Area and the Central Coast.

It has a long root from which erect, tall stems grow, usually exceeding a meter in height and often approaching two meters. The leaves arise on long petioles and are each divided into as many as 15 finger-like, pointed lobes. The top of the stem is occupied with a very large inflorescence usually containing over 50 flowers.

Each flower grows on a pedicel several centimeters long. The sepals point forward, forming a cup around the opening of the somewhat tubular flower. The longest sepals are about a centimeter long, and the spur of the flower may approach two centimeters in length. The flower is generally white to greenish-white to light lavender.
