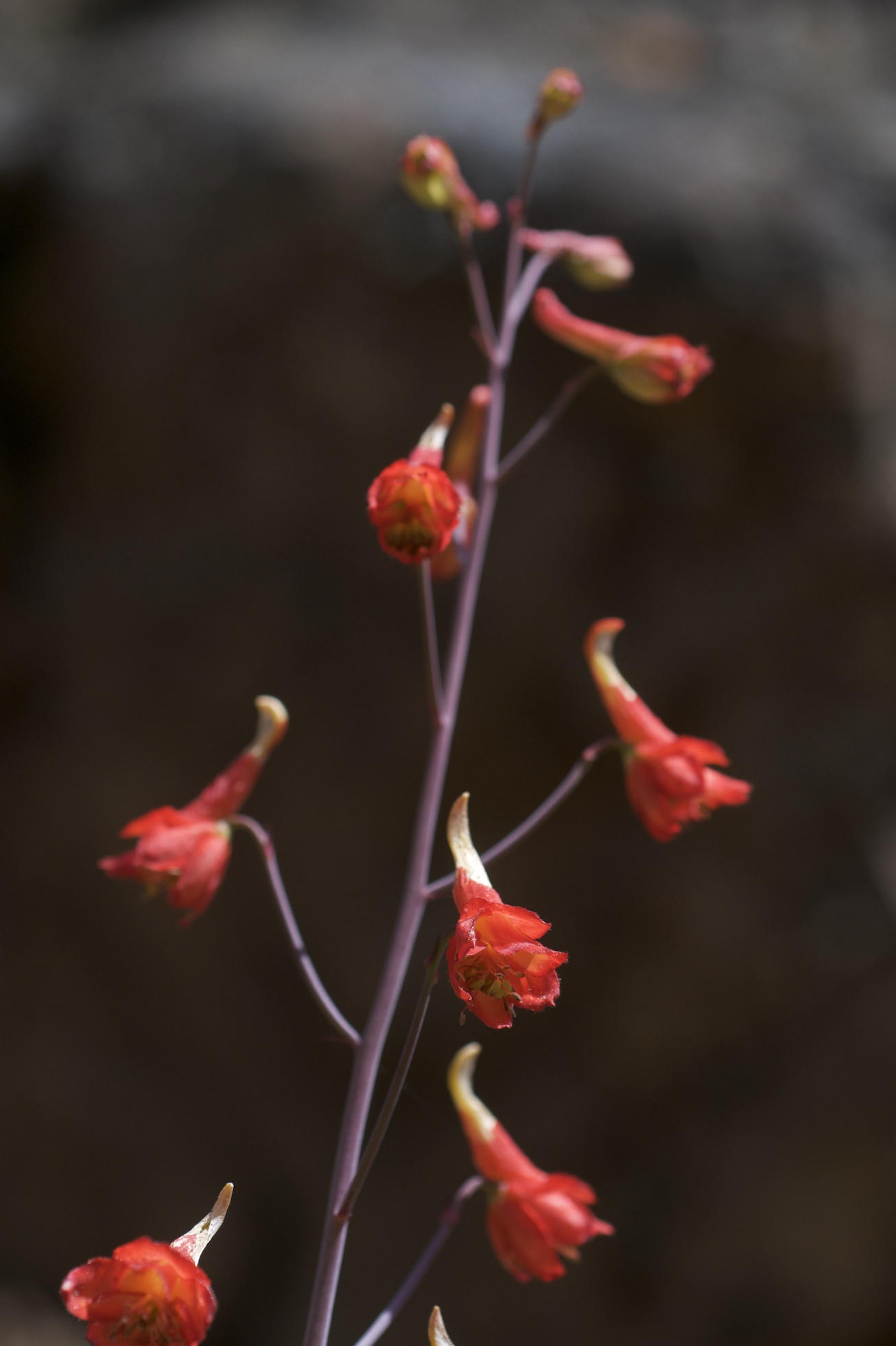

Scientific classification
- Kingdom: Plantae
- Clade: Tracheophytes
- Clade: Angiosperms
- Clade: Eudicots
- Order: Ranunculales
- Family: Ranunculaceae
- Genus: Delphinium
- Species: D. nudicaule

Binomial name
- Delphinium nudicaule Torr. & A.Gray

= Delphinium nudicaule =

Species of plant

Delphinium nudicaule, known by the common names canyon larkspur, red larkspur, orange larkspur, and canyon delphinium, is a flowering herbaceous perennial plant in the buttercup family Ranunculaceae. It is native to low-elevation canyons and slopes, foothills, and mountain ranges of California, US, from the Sierra Nevada to the California Coast Ranges, and of Oregon. It grows below 6,500 feet (2,000 m).

The plant sends up thin and long 1–2 feet (0.30–0.61 m) stems with finely dissected leaves. It bears attractive larkspur flowers in shades of red and orange that are generally pollinated by hummingbirds. D. nudicaule readily hybridizes with several other species of Delphinium.

== Uses ==
The root of Delphinium nudicaule has been historically used as a medicinal narcotic, chiefly by the Mendocino Native Americans of the Yuki tribe. The Concow tribe called the plant sō-ma’ in the Konkow language, and sō-ma’ yem (root).

== Phytochemistry ==
The first phytochemical study of this plant was carried out by Michael Benn and Palaniappan Kulanthaivel at the University of Calgary in Canada. These researchers reported the presence of a number of diterpenoid alkaloids: hetisine, 2-dehydrohetisine, 6-deoxydelcorine, dictyocarpine, dihydrogadesine, methyllycaconitine, lycoctonine, takaosamine, nudicaulamine, nudicauline, and nudicaulidine.

The presence of these alkaloids in D. nudicaule implies that the plant is likely to be quite poisonous. The LD_{50} for MLA is ~5 mg/kg, i.v., in the mouse, and the LD_{50} for nudicauline is ~3 mg/kg, i.v., in the mouse.
