= Delphinium gracilentum =

Scientific classification
- Kingdom: Plantae
- Clade: Tracheophytes
- Clade: Angiosperms
- Clade: Eudicots
- Order: Ranunculales
- Family: Ranunculaceae
- Genus: Delphinium
- Species: D. gracilentum

Binomial name
- Delphinium gracilentum S.Wats.

Synonyms
- Delphinium greenei Delphinium pratense

Species of flowering plant

Delphinium gracilentum is a species of larkspur known by the common name pine forest larkspur. It is endemic to California, where it grows throughout the Sierra Nevada. This wildflower is usually around half a meter in maximum height, with leaves growing from the lowest third of the stem. The leaves usually have five lobes. The upper part of the stem is occupied by widely spaced flowers, which each grow at the end of a pedicel a few centimeters long. The flower color may be any shade of blue, or occasionally white or pinkish. The sepals often curl backwards. The spur is usually between 1 and 1.5 centimeters (0.39 and 0.59 in) long.
