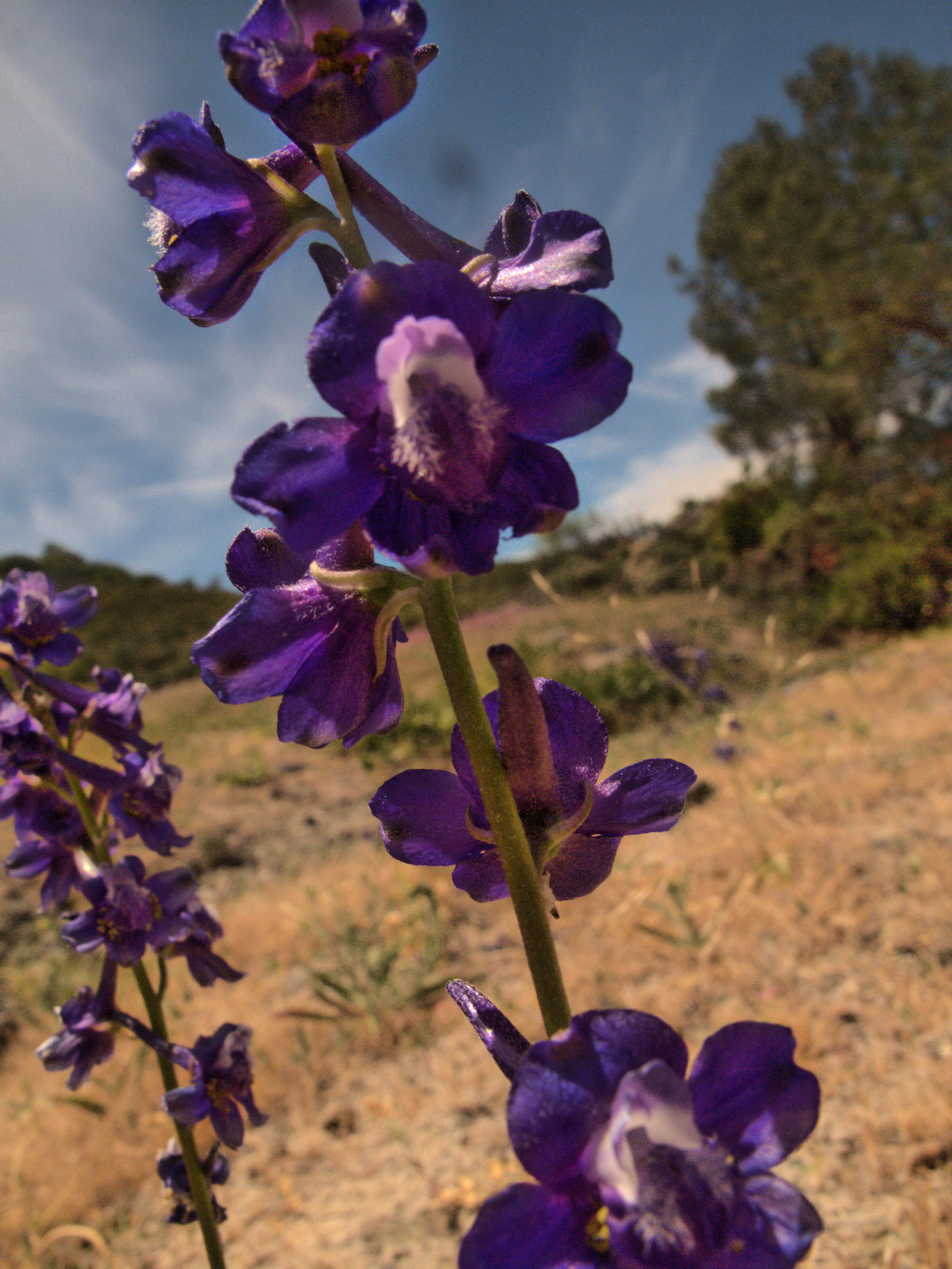

Scientific classification
- Kingdom: Plantae
- Clade: Tracheophytes
- Clade: Angiosperms
- Clade: Eudicots
- Order: Ranunculales
- Family: Ranunculaceae
- Genus: Delphinium
- Species: D. uliginosum

Binomial name
- Delphinium uliginosum Curran

= Delphinium uliginosum =

Species of flowering plant

Delphinium uliginosum is a species of larkspur known by the common names swamp larkspur and bog larkspur. It is endemic to California, where it is known from very localized populations in the Inner North Coast Ranges. It grows in chaparral, grassland, and other habitat in the hills, generally on serpentine soils. This is a perennial herb producing a hairless, erect stem up to 70 centimeters tall. It can be identified by its leaves, which are fan-shaped, a characteristic unique among the larkspurs, which generally have palmate leaves with narrow, fingerlike lobes. The inflorescence bears up to 45 flowers, each on an upright pedicel which may exceed 10 centimeters long. The flower is blue with the longest sepals 1.4 centimeters long and a spur about the same length. The fruit is one or two centimeters long.
