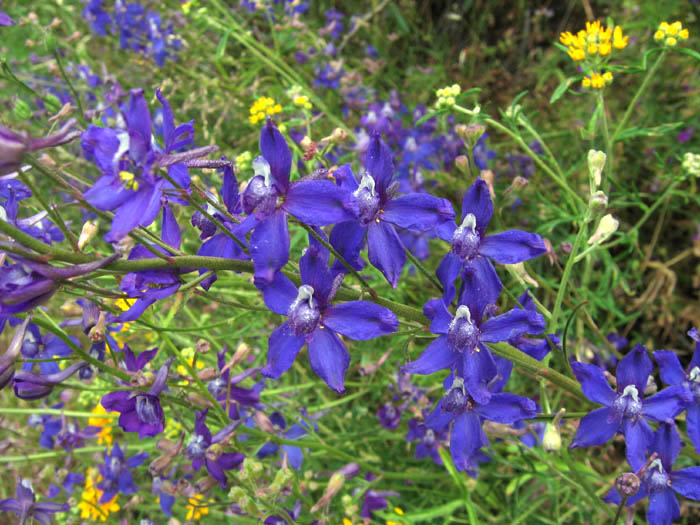

Scientific classification
- Kingdom: Plantae
- Clade: Tracheophytes
- Clade: Angiosperms
- Clade: Eudicots
- Order: Ranunculales
- Family: Ranunculaceae
- Genus: Delphinium
- Species: D. parryi

Binomial name
- Delphinium parryi Gray

= Delphinium parryi =

Species of flowering plant

Delphinium parryi is a species of larkspur known by the common names San Bernardino larkspur and Parry's larkspur. This wildflower is native to Baja California and California from the San Francisco Bay Area south. It is found in chaparral and woodlands and other habitats.

== Description ==
Delphinium parryi may approach 1 metre (3.3 ft) in maximum height. It has fuzzy stems and fuzzy, deeply lobed leaves.

The inflorescence holds a few to over 60 flowers on long pedicels. The sepals and petals are deep purple to light blue, with the upper petals often white. The spur may be over two centimeters long.
