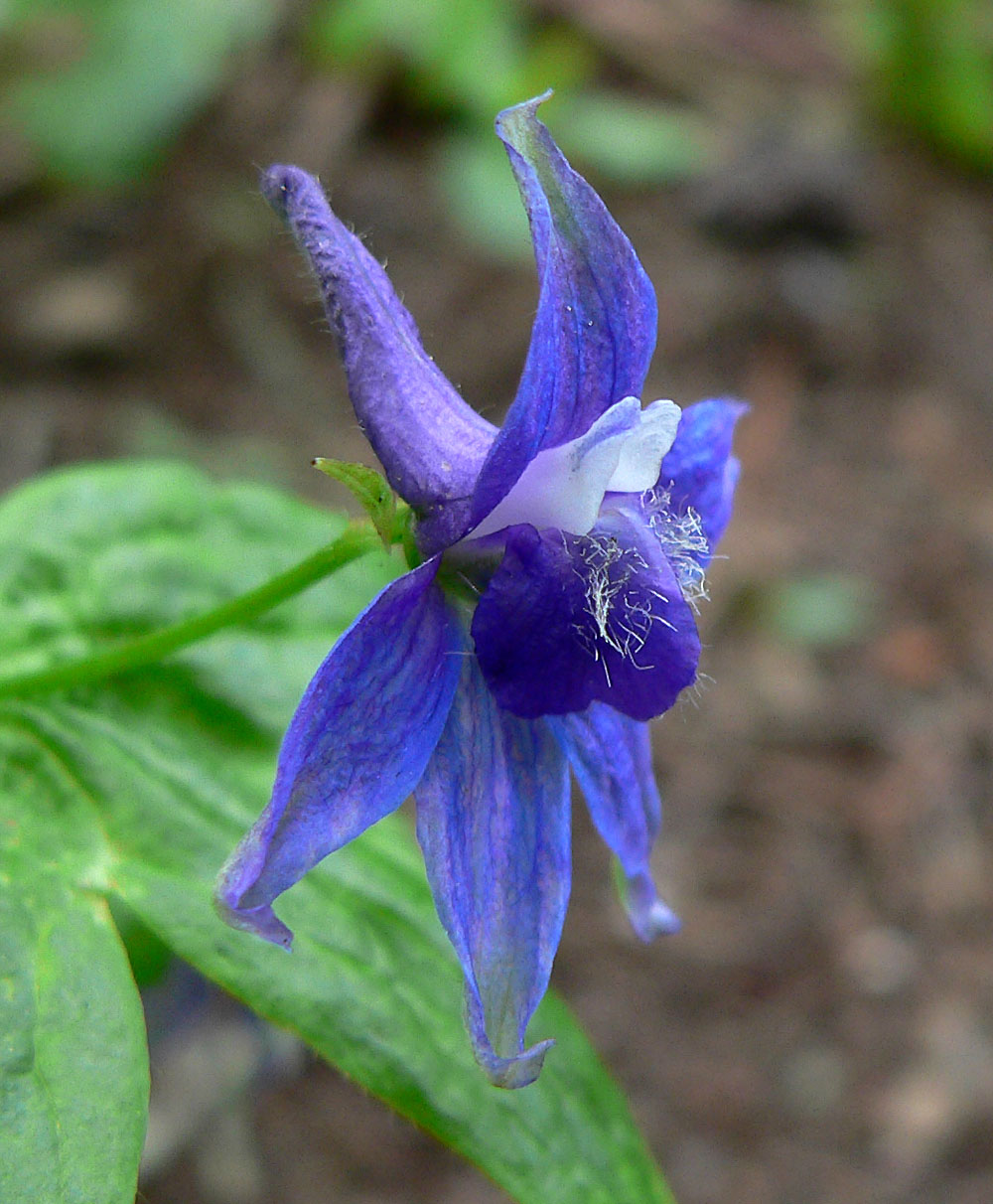

Conservation status
- Endangered (ESA)

- Critically Imperiled (NatureServe)

Scientific classification
- Kingdom: Plantae
- Clade: Tracheophytes
- Clade: Angiosperms
- Clade: Eudicots
- Order: Ranunculales
- Family: Ranunculaceae
- Genus: Delphinium
- Species: D. bakeri

Binomial name
- Delphinium bakeri Ewan

= Delphinium bakeri =

Plant species in the buttercup family

Delphinium bakeri, or Baker's larkspur, is a species of perennial herb in the buttercup family, Ranunculaceae. It is endemic to California in the United States, where it is a federally listed endangered species. It is known in the wild from one remaining occurrence near Salmon Creek in Sonoma County, where only seven plants remained as of March 2006.

D. bakeri grows from a thickened, tuber-like, fleshy cluster of roots, to a height of 70 centimetres (28 in). The leaves occur primarily along the upper third of the stem and are green at the time the plant flowers.

The flowers are irregularly shaped. It has five conspicuous sepals, bright dark blue or purplish, with the rear sepal elongated into a spur. The inconspicuous petals occur in two pairs. The lower pair is oblong and blue-purple, the upper pair oblique and white. Seeds are produced in several dry, many-seeded fruits that split open at maturity on only one side. The species flowers from April through May.

Baker's larkspur grows on decomposed shale within coastal scrub plant community. Its range historically included the Point Reyes Peninsula and areas between Camp Meeker and Petaluma, California.

== Taxonomy ==
Delphinium bakeri was scientifically described and named in 1942 by Joseph Andorfer Ewan. He placed it in the Delphinium genus within the Ranunculaceae family. The species has no botanical synonyms or varieties.

== Near-extinction incidents caused by road crews ==
In July 2002, county-hired road crews mowing weeds in the critical habitat area cut down 30 to 50 Baker's larkspurs. Scientists initially believed the action might have caused the species' extinction.

In October 2004, the plant was nearly made extinct in earnest by road workers using heavy machinery to unclog a roadside drain. The last remaining population of about 100 plants was reduced to five individuals.

== See also ==
- Milo Samuel Baker
