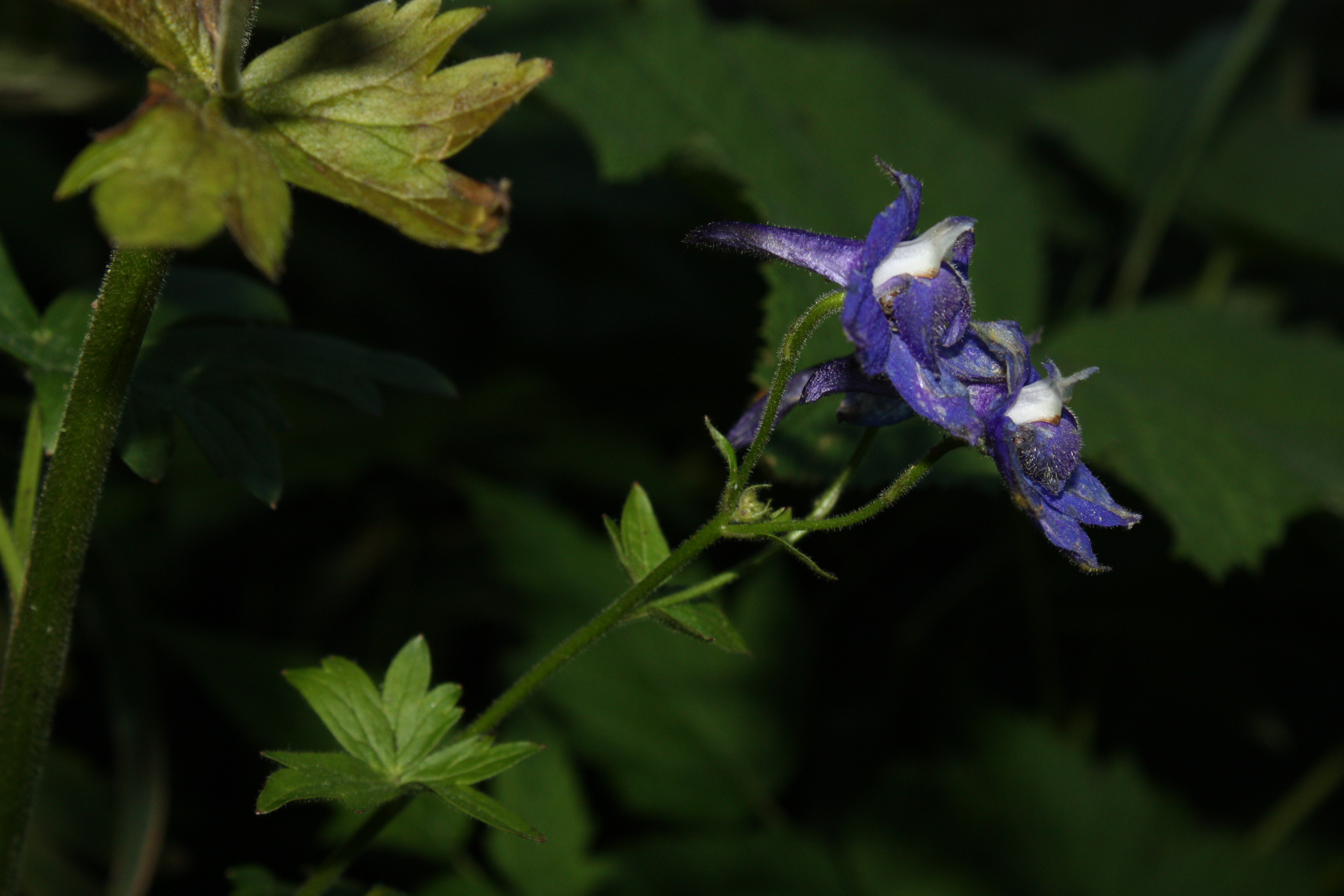

Scientific classification
- Kingdom: Plantae
- Clade: Tracheophytes
- Clade: Angiosperms
- Clade: Eudicots
- Order: Ranunculales
- Family: Ranunculaceae
- Genus: Delphinium
- Species: D. trolliifolium

Binomial name
- Delphinium trolliifolium Gray

= Delphinium trolliifolium =

Species of flowering plant

Delphinium trolliifolium is a species of larkspur known by the common names poison delphinium, cow poison, and Columbian larkspur. It is native to Washington, Oregon, and northern California. This wildflower reaches one half to just over one meter in height. It has large, shiny, deeply lobed leaves. The top half of the stem is an inflorescence of widely spaced flowers on long pedicels, the longest over nine centimeters long. The flowers are usually deep brilliant blue. The upper two petals may be milky white. The spur exceeds two centimeters in length in the largest of the flowers. This plant is toxic (particularly to livestock) as suggested by the common names, but most larkspur species are toxic to some degree.
