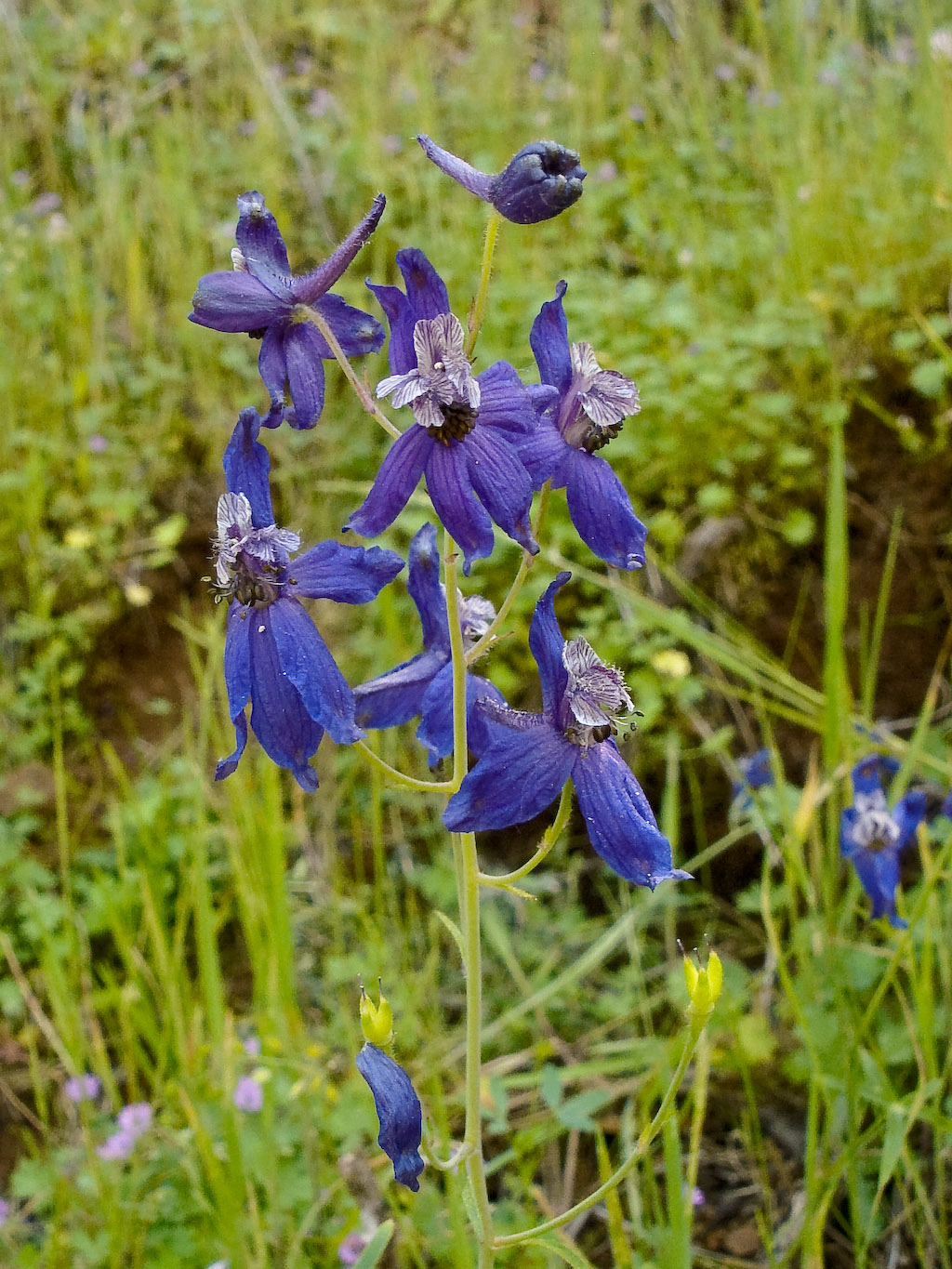

Conservation status
- Secure (NatureServe)

Scientific classification
- Kingdom: Plantae
- Clade: Tracheophytes
- Clade: Angiosperms
- Clade: Eudicots
- Order: Ranunculales
- Family: Ranunculaceae
- Genus: Delphinium
- Species: D. hesperium

Binomial name
- Delphinium hesperium A.Gray

= Delphinium hesperium =

Species of flowering plant

Delphinium hesperium is a species of larkspur known by the common name foothill larkspur. It is also sometimes called western larkspur and coastal larkspur, but these names are less specific since other species share them. It is endemic to California, where it grows in woodland and grassland in the northern half of the state. This wildflower generally reaches one-half to one meter (1 ft 8 in to 3 ft 3 in) in height. It has deeply lobed, prominently veined leaves, mostly located near the base of the plant. The inflorescence may hold very few to over 100 flowers, each on a long, thick pedicel. The flowers are usually a brilliant blue or purple, and sometimes lighter pinkish to white. Often, the sepals are dark in color, and the petals are lighter. The spur is about one to two centimeters (0.79 in) long.

There are three subspecies of this plant. The Cuyamaca larkspur (ssp. cuyamacae) is native to the Peninsular Ranges, occurring near Cuyamaca Lake and possibly Palomar Mountain in San Diego County. The ssp. hesperium is native to the North Coast Ranges. The pale-flowered western larkspur (ssp. pallescens), which has white, pink, or light blue sepals, occurs in the Coast Ranges.
