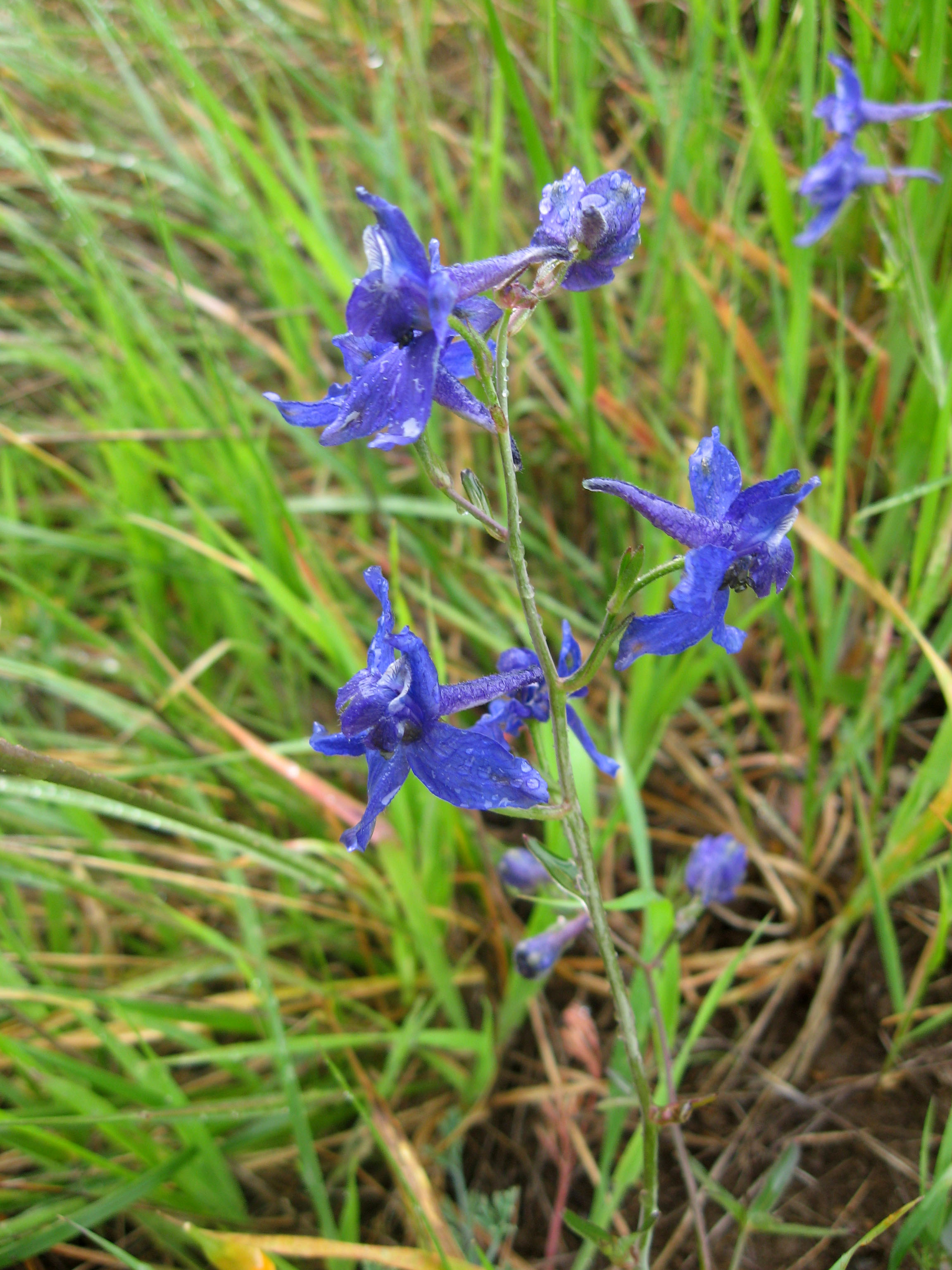

Scientific classification
- Kingdom: Plantae
- Clade: Tracheophytes
- Clade: Angiosperms
- Clade: Eudicots
- Order: Ranunculales
- Family: Ranunculaceae
- Genus: Delphinium
- Species: D. patens

Binomial name
- Delphinium patens Benth.

= Delphinium patens =

Species of flowering plant

Delphinium patens is a species of larkspur known by the common names zigzag larkspur and spreading larkspur. It is a wildflower limited mainly to California. Though not yet confirmed there, it is expected in Baja California. Plants grow typically 20 to 50 centimeters tall and bear up to 36 flowers each. The stems are mostly hairless, have reddish bases, and bears leaves on the lower half. Each leaf is divided into 3 to 9 lobes. The flower has dark blue sepals, the latter ones reflexed. The spur at the back of the flower is 4 to 8 millimeters long. The cleft at the center of the flower has white or yellowish scattered hairs. The elongated fruit is one or two centimeters long and contains pitted seeds.

There are three subspecies:

- Delphinium patens subsp. hepaticoideum
- Delphinium patens subsp. montanum
- Delphinium patens subsp. patens

Delphinium patens hybridizes freely with a few other species in Delphinium section Grumosa in the wild.
