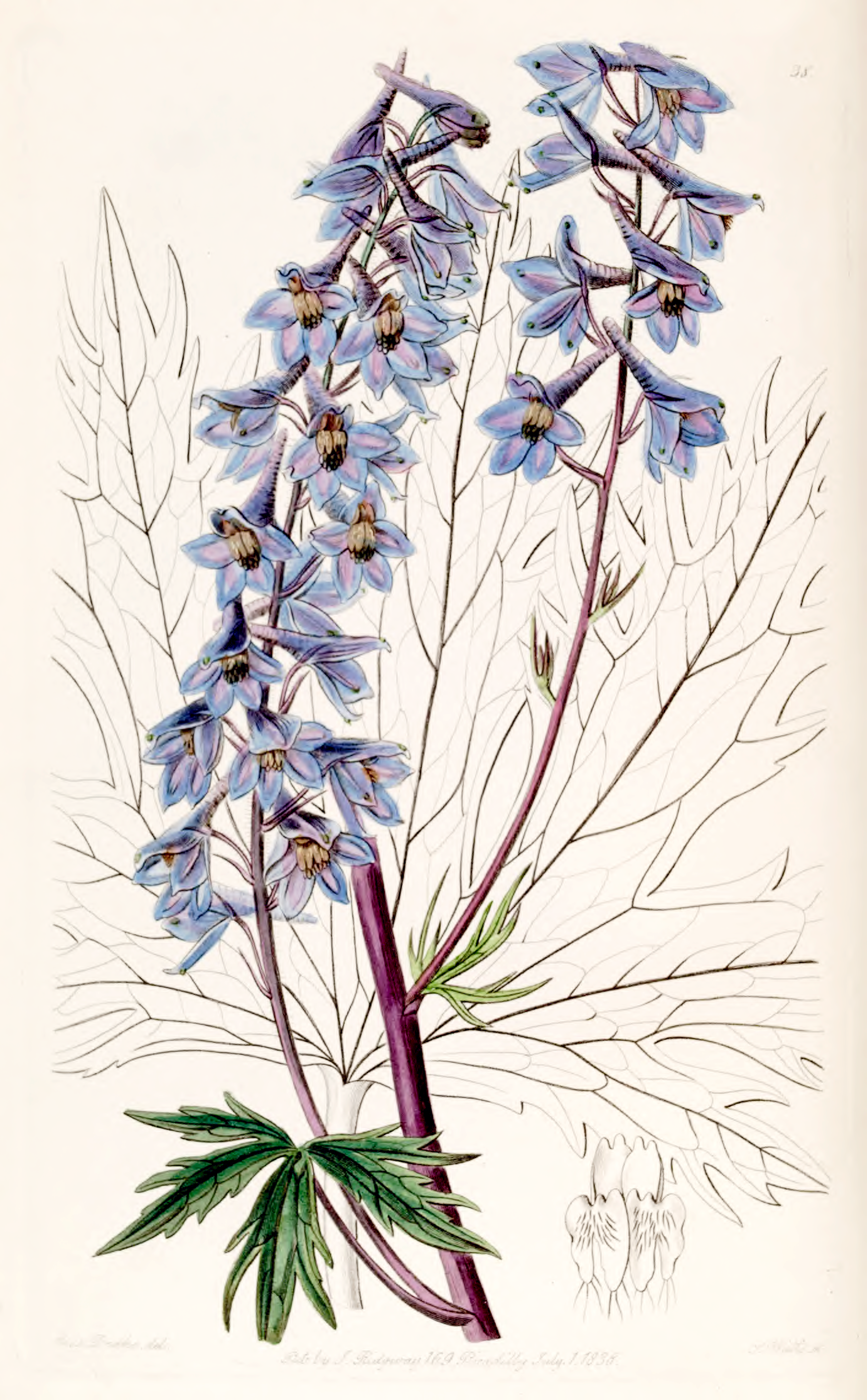
- Delphinium elatum

Scientific classification
- Kingdom: Plantae
- Clade: Tracheophytes
- Clade: Angiosperms
- Clade: Eudicots
- Order: Ranunculales
- Family: Ranunculaceae
- Subfamily: Ranunculoideae
- Tribe: Delphinieae
- Genus: Delphinium; L.

= Delphinium =

Genus of flowering plants

Delphinium is a genus of about 300 species of annual and perennial flowering plants in the family Ranunculaceae, native throughout the Northern Hemisphere and also on the high mountains of tropical Africa. The genus was erected by Carl Linnaeus.

All members of the genus Delphinium are toxic to humans and livestock. The common name larkspur is shared between perennial Delphinium species and annual species of the genus Consolida. Molecular data show that Consolida, as well as another segregate genus, Aconitella, are both embedded in Delphinium.

The genus name Delphinium derives from the Ancient Greek word δελφίνιον (delphínion) which means "dolphin", a name used in De Materia Medica for some kind of larkspur. Pedanius Dioscorides said the plant got its name because of its dolphin-shaped flowers.

== Habitat ==
Species with short stems and few flowers such as Delphinium nuttallianum and Delphinium bicolor appear in habitats like prairies and the sagebrush steppe. Tall and robust species with many flowers, such as Delphinium occidentale, appear more often in forests.

== Description ==
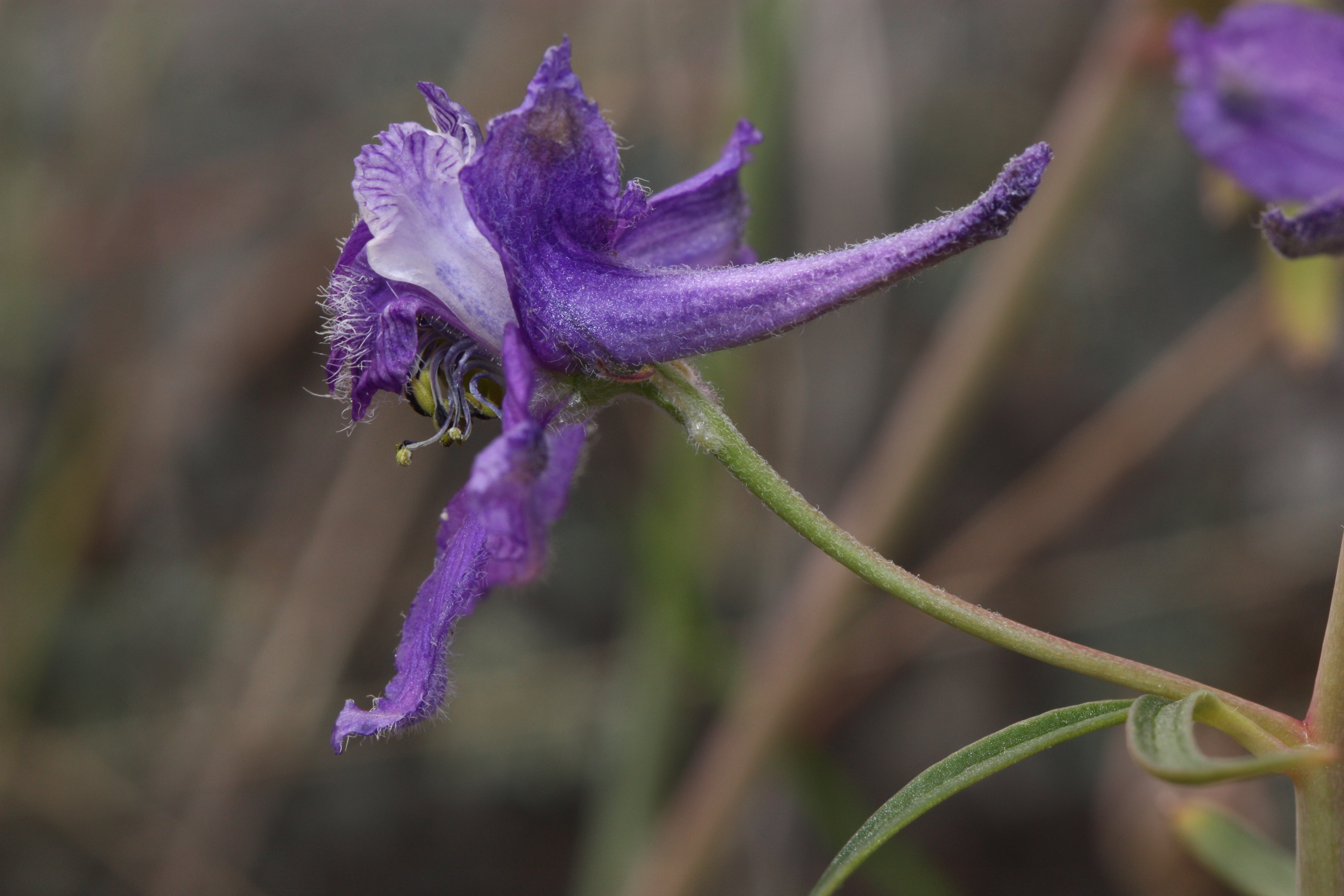
Flowers of most species have five spreading sepals and four petals (e.g. Delphinium nuttallianum).

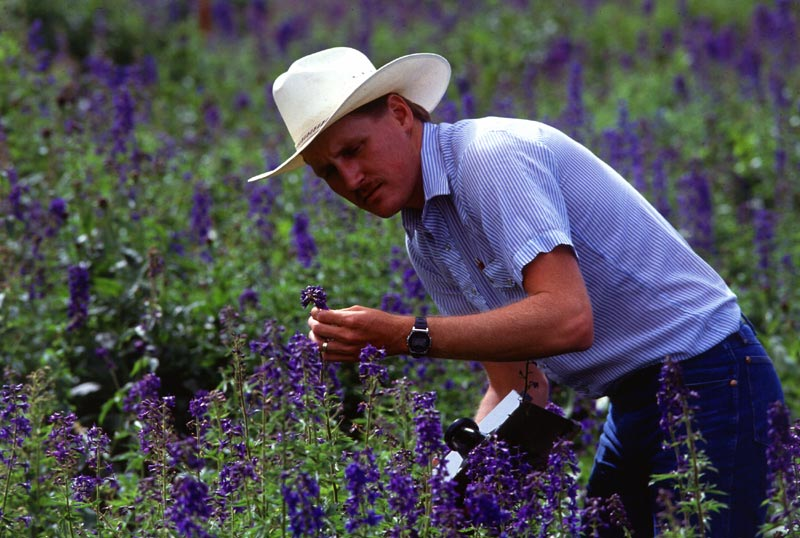
In high mountain habitat, central Utah rangelands

The leaves are deeply lobed with three to seven toothed, pointed lobes in a palmate shape. The main flowering stem is erect, and varies greatly in size between the species, from 10 centimetres in some alpine species, up to 2 m tall in the larger meadowland species.

In June and July (Northern Hemisphere), the plant is topped with a raceme of many flowers, varying in colour from purple and blue, to red, yellow, or white. The flowers are bilaterally symmetrical and have many stamens. In most species, each flower consists of five petal-like sepals which grow together to form a hollow pocket with a spur at the end, which gives the plant its name, usually more or less dark blue. Within the sepals are four true petals, small, inconspicuous, and commonly coloured similarly to the sepals. The uppermost sepal is spurred, and encloses the nectar-secreting spurs of the two upper petals.

The seeds are small and often shiny black. The plants flower from late spring to late summer, and are pollinated by butterflies and bumble bees. Despite the toxicity, Delphinium species are used as food plants by the larvae of some Lepidoptera species, including the dot moth and small angle shades.

== Taxonomy ==
=== Delineation of Delphinium ===
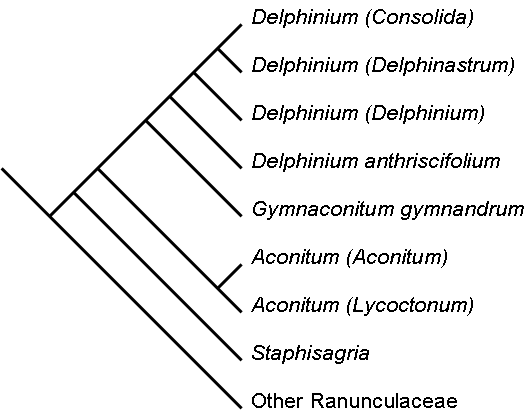
Subgenera of Delphinium and related taxa

Genetic analysis suggests that Delphinium sensu lato, as it was delineated before the 21st century, is polyphyletic. Nested within Delphinium s.l. are Aconitella, Consolida, and Aconitum. To make Delphinium monophyletic, several interventions were made. The new genus Staphisagria was erected containing Staphisagria macrosperma (D. staphisagria), S. requienii (D. requini) and S. picta (D. pictum), representing the sister group to all other Delphinieae. Further genetic analysis has shown that the two large subgenera Aconitum (Aconitum) and Aconitum (Lycoctonum) are the sister group to Aconitum gymnandrum, Delphinium (Delphinium), Delphinium (Delphinastrum), Consolida and Aconitella. To make Aconitum monophyletic, A. gymnandrum has now been reassigned to a new monotypic genus, Gymnaconitum. Finally, Consolida and Aconitella are synonymized with Delphinium.

=== Subgenera ===
D. arthriscifolium is sister to all other species of Delphinium sensu stricto (so excluding Staphisagria). It should be placed in its own subgenus, but no proposal naming this subgenus has been made yet. The subgenera Delphinium (Delphinium) and Delphinium (Delphinastrum) are sister to the group consisting of the species of Consolida and Aconitella, which together make up the subgenus Delphinium (Consolida). Aconitella cannot be retained as a subgenus because A. barbata does not cluster with the remaining species previously assigned to that genus, without creating five further subgenera.

=== Selected species ===
Species include:

- Delphinium andersonii
- Delphinium arthriscifolium
- Delphinium bakeri
- Delphinium barbeyi
- Delphinium bicolor
- Delphinium brunonianum
- Delphinium californicum
- Delphinium calthifolium
- Delphinium cardinale
- Delphinium carolinianum
- Delphinium cheilanthum
- Delphinium consolida
- Delphinium decorum
- Delphinium denudatum
- Delphinium depauperatum
- Delphinium elatum
- Delphinium exaltatum
- Delphinium formosum
- Delphinium glaucum
- Delphinium gracilentum
- Delphinium grandiflorum
- Delphinium gypsophilum
- Delphinium hansenii
- Delphinium hesperium
- Delphinium hutchinsoniae
- Delphinium hybridum
- Delphinium inopinum
- Delphinium ithaburense
- Delphinium leucophaeum
- Delphinium luteum
- Delphinium malabaricum
- Delphinium nudicaule
- Delphinium nuttallianum
- Delphinium occidentale
- Delphinium parishii
- Delphinium parryi
- Delphinium patens
- Delphinium pavonaceum
- Delphinium peregrinum
- Delphinium polycladon
- Delphinium purpusii
- Delphinium recurvatum
- Delphinium robustum
- Delphinium scopulorum
- Delphinium stachydeum
- Delphinium tricorne
- Delphinium trolliifolium
- Delphinium uliginosum
- Delphinium umbraculorum
- Delphinium variegatum
- Delphinium viridescens

=== Reassigned species ===
Several species of Delphinium have been reassigned:

- D. pictum = Staphisagria picta
- D. requienii = Staphisagria requienii
- D. staphisagria = Staphisagria macrosperma

== Ecology ==
Delphiniums can attract butterflies and other pollinators.

== Cultivation ==
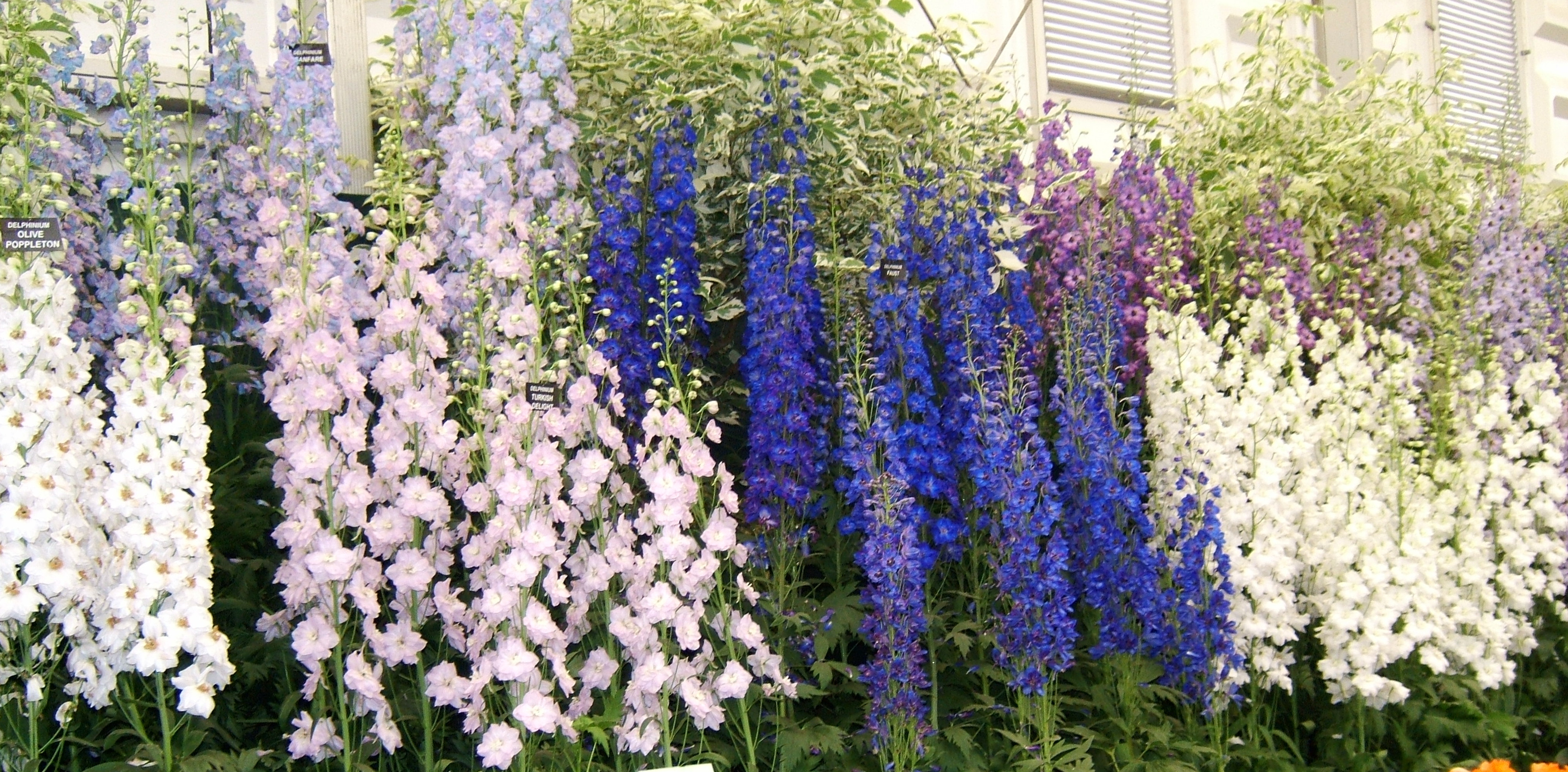
Delphiniums displayed at the Chelsea Flower Show

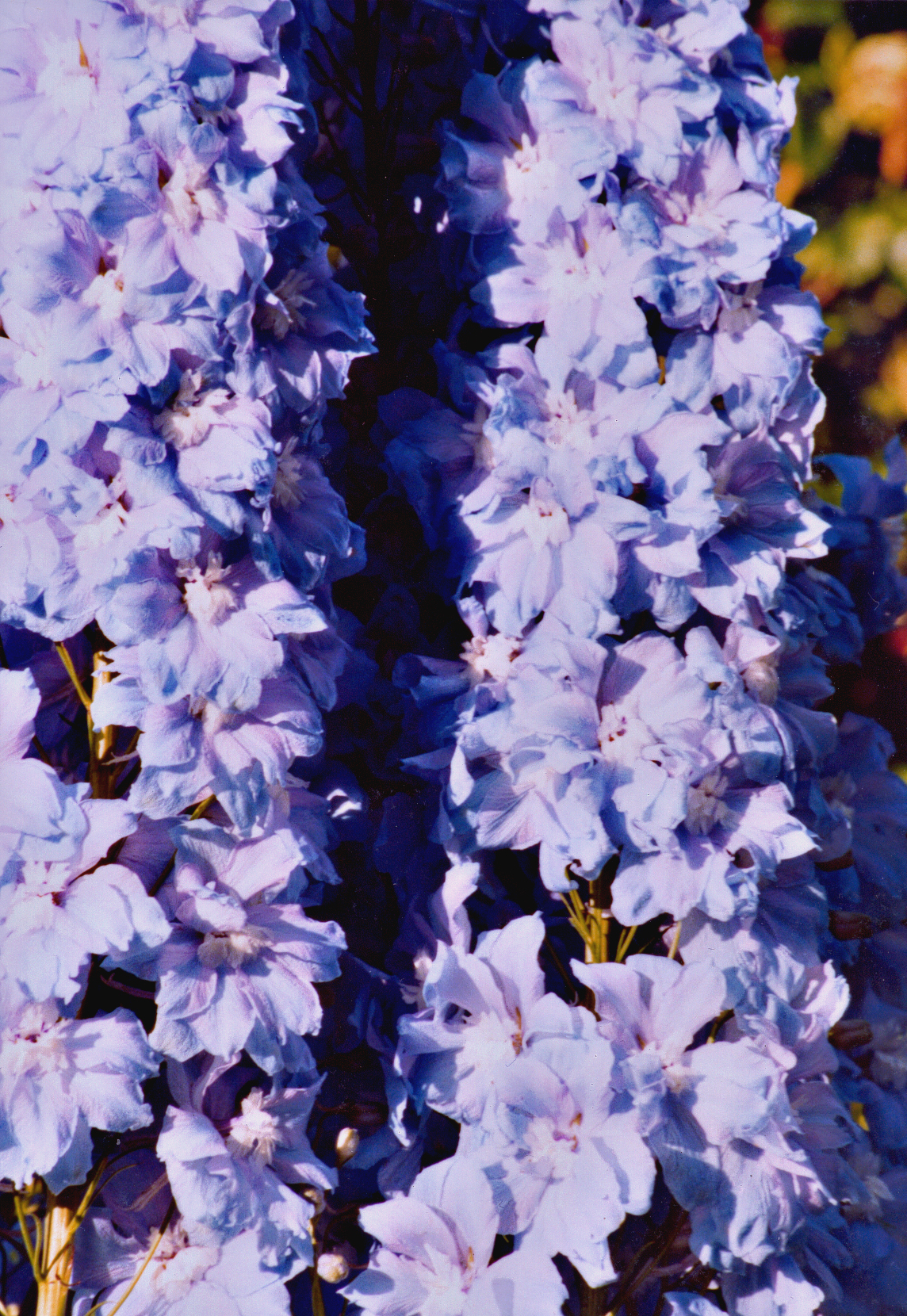
A Delphinium cultivar

Various delphiniums are cultivated as ornamental plants, for traditional and native plant gardens. The numerous hybrids and cultivars are primarily used as garden plants, providing height at the back of the summer border, in association with roses, lilies, and geraniums.

Most delphinium hybrids and cultivars are derived from D. elatum. Hybridisation was developed in the 19th century, led by Victor Lemoine in France. Other hybrid crosses have included D. bruninianum, D. cardinale, D. cheilanthum, and D. formosum.

Numerous cultivars have been selected as garden plants, and for cut flowers and floristry. They are available in shades of white, pink, purple, and blue. The blooming plant is also used in displays and specialist competitions at flower and garden shows, such as the Chelsea Flower Show.

The 'Pacific Giant' hybrids are a group with individual single-colour cultivar names, developed by Reinelt in the United States. They typically grow to 1.2–1.8 m (4–6 ft) tall on long stems, by 60–90 cm (2–3 ft) wide. They reportedly can tolerate deer. Millennium delphinium hybrids, bred by Dowdeswell's in New Zealand, are reportedly better in warmer climates than the Pacific hybrids. Flower colours in shades of red, orange, and pink have been hybridized from D. cardinale by Americans Reinelt and Samuelson.

Since 2024 the UK National Collection of delphiniums has been held by Colin Parton at Delph Cottage Garden, south east of Leeds. Parton has over 100 cultivars, 21 of which are on the endangered list on Plant Heritage's Threatened Plants Programme. He occasionally opens his garden to the public in return for a donation to the charity Cancer Research.

=== Award of garden merit ===
The following delphinium cultivars have received the Award of Garden Merit from the British Royal Horticultural Society:

Name	Height (m)	Flower colour	Eye colour	Ref.
'Atholl'	1.5	white	brown	
'Blue Dawn'	2.2	mauve (pale)	brown	
'Blue Nile'	1.5	blue (mid)	white	
'Bruce'	2.0	violet (deep)	buff	
'Can-can'	1.5	violet (pale)	(double)	
'Centurion Sky Blue'	1.5	blue (light)	white	
'Cherub'	1.5	mauve (pale)	cream	
'Clifford Sky'	2.0	blue (sky)	white	
'Conspicuous'	1.5	mauve	brown	
'Elisabeth Sahin'	1.5	white	cream	
'Elizabeth Cook'	1.5	white	white	
'Emily Hawkins'	1.5	lilac	brown	
'Faust'	1.8	blue (deep)	black	
'Fenella'	1.5	blue (dark)	black	
'Foxhill Nina'	1.5	pink (pale)	white	
'Galileo'	1.8	blue (mid)	black	
'Holly Cookland Wilkins'	2.5	violet	brown	
'Jill Curley'	2.1	white	cream	
'Kennington Classic'	2.5	white	yellow	
'Kestrel'	2.0	blue (bright)	brown	
'Langdon's Blue Lagoon'	1.9	blue (mid)	white	
'Langdon's Pandora'	2.5	blue (sky)	brown	
'Lilian Bassett'	1.5	white	brown	
'Lord Butler'	1.5	blue (light)	white	
'Lucia Sahin'	2.0	pink/purple	brown	
'Margaret'	1.5	blue (bright)	white	
'Michael Ayres'	1.5	violet (deep)	brown	
'Min'	2.0	violet	brown	
'Olive Poppleton'	2.5	white	yellow	
'Oliver'	1.5	blue (light)	black	
'Our Deb'	1.5	pink (pale)	brown	
'Purple Velvet'	1.5	violet	brown/yellow	
'Raymond Lister'	1.7	blue (mid)	brown	
'Rosemary Brock'	1.5	pink	brown	
'Rosy Future'	1.2	pink	white/black	
'Spindrift'	1.5	lilac (pale)	white	
'Sungleam'	2.0	cream	yellow	
'Sunkissed'	1.5	white	yellow	
'Sweethearts'	2.5	pink (rose)	white	
'Tiddles'	1.5	mauve	(double)	
'Walton Gemstone'	2.0	violet (pale)	white	

== Toxicity ==
All parts of these plants are considered toxic to humans, especially the younger parts, causing severe digestive discomfort if ingested, and skin irritation. Larkspur, especially tall larkspur, is a significant cause of cattle poisoning on rangelands in the western United States. Larkspur is more common in high-elevation areas, and many ranchers delay moving cattle onto such ranges until late summer when the toxicity of the plants is reduced. Death is through cardiotoxic and neuromuscular blocking effects, and can occur within a few hours of ingestion. All parts of the plant contain various diterpenoid alkaloids, typified by methyllycaconitine, and are very poisonous.

== Uses ==
The juice of the flowers, particularly D. consolida, mixed with alum, gives a blue ink.

All plant parts are poisonous in large doses, especially the seeds, that contain up to 1.4% of alkaloids.
