= Perry Park, Colorado =

Unincorporated community in Douglas County, CO, USA

- Census-designated place
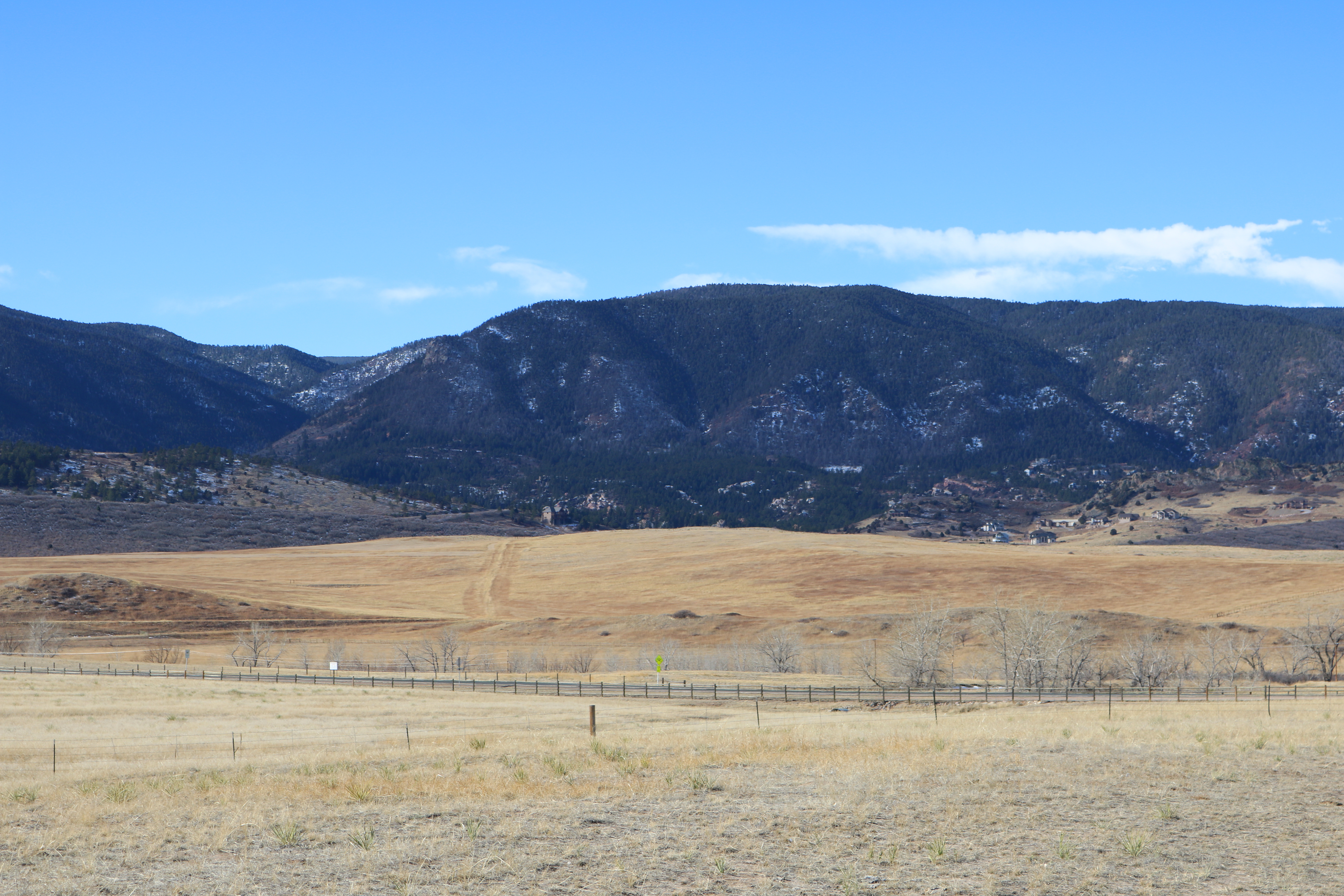
- Parry Park and the Rampart Range.

- Location of the Perry Park CDP in Douglas County, Colorado
- Coordinates: 39°15′34″N 104°58′56″W
- Country: United States
- State: Colorado
- County: Douglas County

Government
  - Type: unincorporated community

Area
  - Total: 8.587 sq mi (22.240 km^{2})
  - Land: 8.552 sq mi (22.149 km^{2})
  - Water: 0.035 sq mi (0.091 km^{2})
- Elevation: 6,493 ft (1,979 m)

Population (2020)
  - Total: 1,932
  - Density: 225.9/sq mi (87.23/km^{2})
- Time zone: UTC-7 (MST)
  - Summer (DST): UTC-6 (MDT)
- ZIP Code: Larkspur 80118
- Area codes: 303 & 720
- GNIS feature ID: 2409056

Perry Park is an unincorporated community and a census-designated place (CDP) located in Douglas County, Colorado, United States. The CDP is a part of the Denver–Aurora–Lakewood, CO Metropolitan Statistical Area. The population of the Perry Park CDP was 1,932 at the United States Census 2020. The Perry Park Metropolitan District and the Perry Park Water & Sanitation District provide services. The Larkspur post office (Zip Code 80118) serves the area.

== History ==
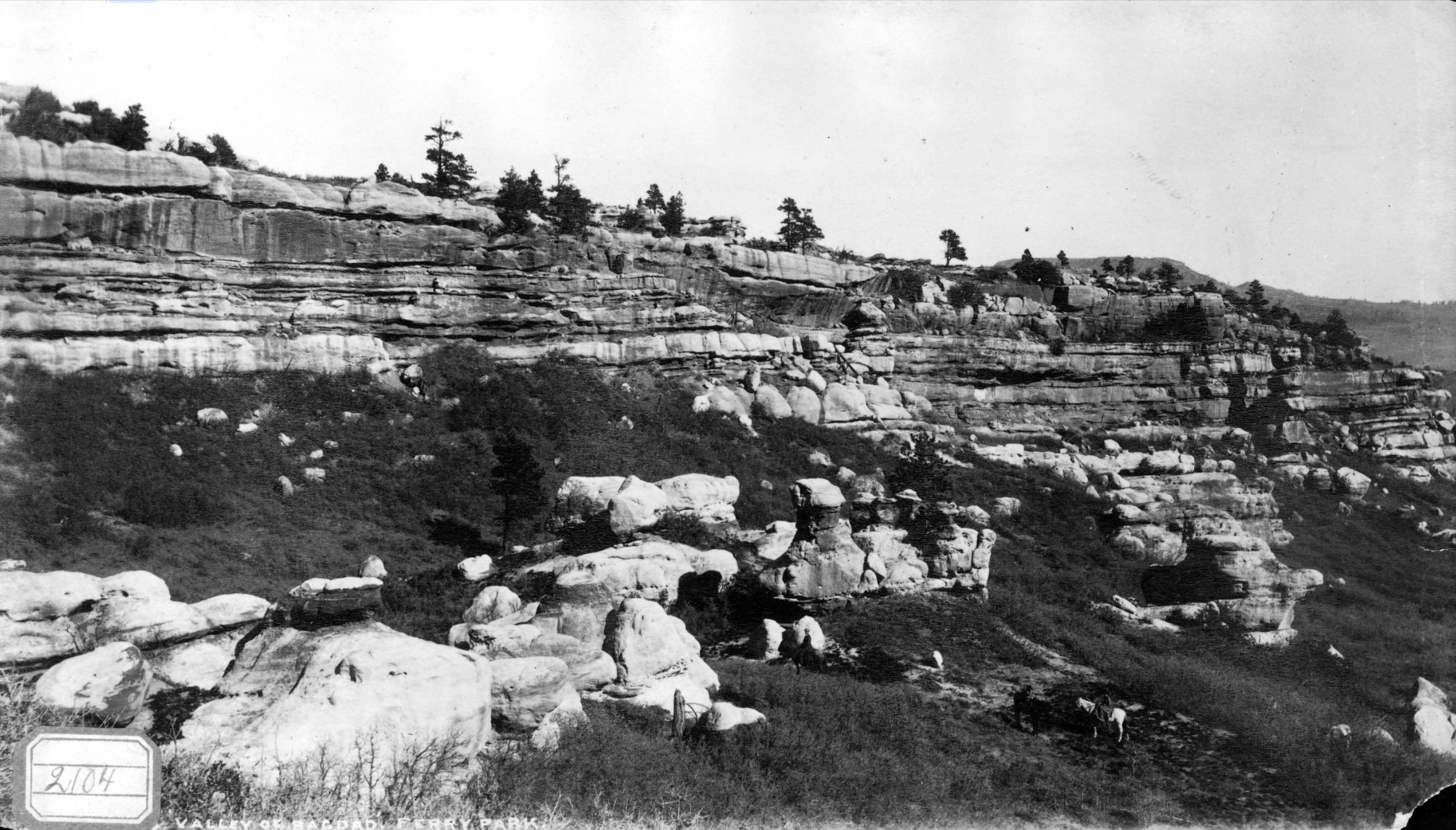
Rock formations, then named as the Valley of Bagdad, in Perry Park, c. 1880s

The Perry Park area was originally inhabited by the Ute, Kiowa, Arapaho and Cheyenne Native American tribes. It was not settled by American immigrants until the 1858 Pike's Peak Gold Rush near present-day Colorado Springs. Then ranchers such as Ben Quick and George Ratcliffe began settling in the area. In 1870 John D. Perry, president of the Kansas Pacific Railroad, visited Colorado and purchased the 4,000-acre (16 km^{2}) "Pleasant Park" that would eventually be named Perry Park. Mr. Perry's son, Charles, became a permanent resident of the ranch and raised short-horn cattle in the area until his death in 1876. Charles Perry died as a result of being kicked by a horse on the ranch. In 1888 John Perry, along with a number of other investors created the Red Stone Town, Land, & Mining Company which attempted to turn Pleasant Park into a resort destination. A dam was constructed, creating Lake Wauconda. A large hotel was built southwest of the lake.

One of the investors, Charles Roberts, built one of the only homes in the new development along the shores of Lake Wauconda (even though the entire area surrounding the lake was platted for home development). The Roberts home—the Manor House—is now the clubhouse for Perry Park Country Club.

Attempts to extend the railroad running through Larkspur directly into the park failed and the resort failed to prosper. Land deed problems contributed to the failure of the resort since many parcels of land could not be legally traced to the owners. The ranch changed hands many times in the early to mid-1900s. The hotel was eventually destroyed by fire.

== Geography ==
Perry Park is located in south-central Douglas County at the foot of the Rampart Range, the eastern edge of the Rocky Mountains in this area. It is 15 miles (24 km) southwest of Castle Rock, the Douglas County seat. Perry Park Ranch is known for the dramatic array of 'red rock' sandstone rock formations. They are part of the Fountain Formation, which is found along the eastern mountain face of the Front Range. The Pike National Forest and Rampart Range neighbor the community to the west.

The Perry Park CDP has an area of 5,496 acres (22.240 km^{2}), including 22 acres (0.091 km^{2}) of water.

== Demographics ==
The United States Census Bureau initially defined the Perry Park CDP for the United States Census 2000.

Perry Park CDP, Colorado
Year	Pop.	±%
2000	1,180	—
2010	1,646	+39.5%
2020	1,932	+17.4%
Source: United States Census Bureau

=== 2020 census ===
As of the 2020 census, Perry Park had a population of 1,932. The median age was 54.6 years. 14.0% of residents were under the age of 18 and 29.2% of residents were 65 years of age or older. For every 100 females there were 108.6 males, and for every 100 females age 18 and over there were 108.0 males age 18 and over.

0.0% of residents lived in urban areas, while 100.0% lived in rural areas.

There were 796 households in Perry Park, of which 18.3% had children under the age of 18 living in them. Of all households, 75.5% were married-couple households, 9.9% were households with a male householder and no spouse or partner present, and 10.7% were households with a female householder and no spouse or partner present. About 12.0% of all households were made up of individuals and 5.3% had someone living alone who was 65 years of age or older.

There were 837 housing units, of which 4.9% were vacant. The homeowner vacancy rate was 0.5% and the rental vacancy rate was 4.8%.

Racial composition as of the 2020 census
Race	Number	Percent
White	1,725	89.3%
Black or African American	8	0.4%
American Indian and Alaska Native	11	0.6%
Asian	23	1.2%
Native Hawaiian and Other Pacific Islander	0	0.0%
Some other race	19	1.0%
Two or more races	146	7.6%
Hispanic or Latino (of any race)	106	5.5%

== Education ==
The Douglas County School District serves Perry Park.

== Area events ==
The Colorado Renaissance Festival, at Larkspur, is an annual summer event in the area.

== See also ==
- Front Range Urban Corridor
- Denver-Aurora-Boulder, CO Combined Statistical Area
- Denver-Aurora-Broomfield, CO Metropolitan Statistical Area
