= Roxborough Park, Colorado =

Unincorporated community in Douglas County, CO, USA

- Census-designated place
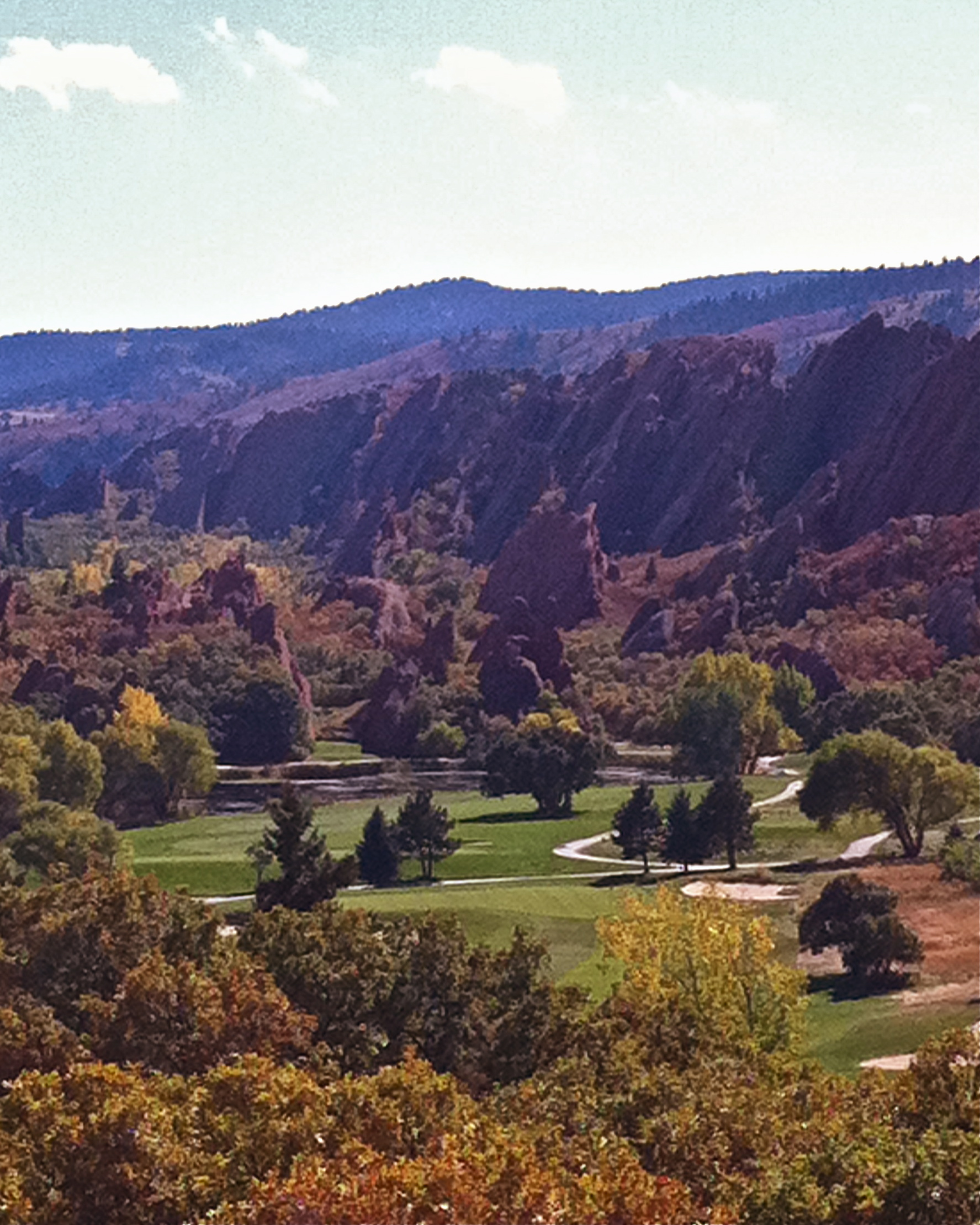
- Roxborough Park

- Location of the Roxborough Park CDP in Douglas County, Colorado
- Coordinates: 39°26′57″N 105°04′29″W
- Country: United States
- State: Colorado
- County: Douglas County

Government
  - Type: Unincorporated community

Area
  - Total: 9.358 sq mi (24.238 km^{2})
  - Land: 9.232 sq mi (23.911 km^{2})
  - Water: 0.126 sq mi (0.327 km^{2})
- Elevation: 5,945 ft (1,812 m)

Population (2020)
  - Total: 9,416
  - Density: 1,020/sq mi (393.8/km^{2})
- Time zone: UTC-7 (MST)
  - Summer (DST): UTC-6 (MDT)
- ZIP Code: Littleton 80125
- Area codes: 303 & 720
- GNIS feature ID: 2409221

Roxborough Park is an unincorporated community and a census-designated place (CDP) located in and governed by Douglas County, Colorado, United States. The CDP is a part of the Denver–Aurora–Lakewood, CO Metropolitan Statistical Area. The population of the Roxborough Park CDP was 9,416 at the United States Census 2020. The Roxborough Village Metropolitan District and the Roxborough Water and Sanitation District provide services. The Littleton post office (Zip Code 80125) serves the area.

== Geography ==
Roxborough Park sits at the foot of the Front Range of the Rocky Mountains. The Dakota Hogback, a prominent sandstone ridge, runs north–south through the community. The CDP is bordered to the west by Pike National Forest, and Roxborough State Park, known for its dramatic sandstone formations, is on the southern edge of the community. Downtown Denver is 25 miles (40 km) to the northeast.

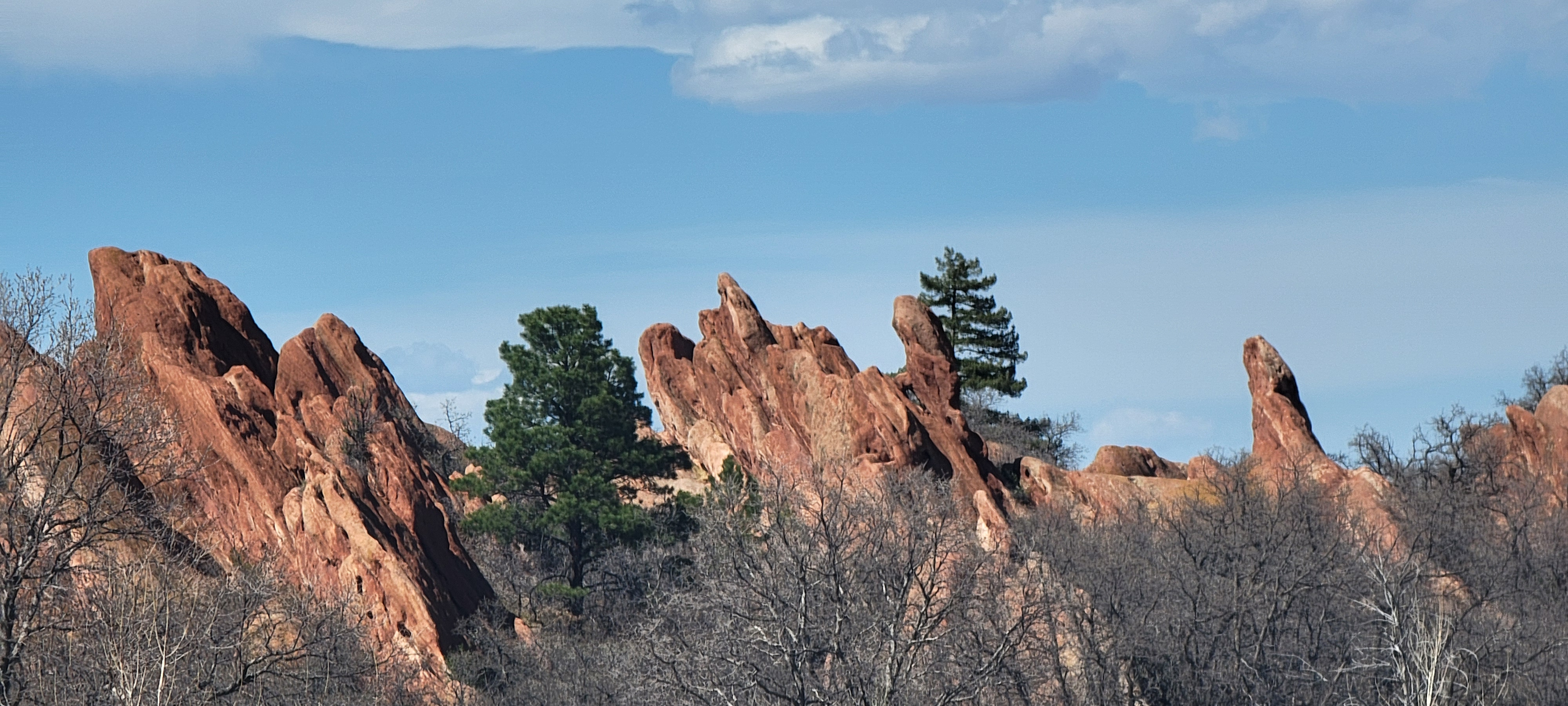
View of the ridge from the Roxborough state park

The Roxborough Park CDP has an area of 5,989 acres (24.238 km^{2}), including 81 acres (0.327 km^{2}) of water.

== Demographics ==
As of the census of 2000, there were 4,446 people, 1,587 households, and 1,328 families residing in the CDP. The population density was 457.9 inhabitants per square mile (176.8/km^{2}). There were 1,637 housing units at an average density of 168.6 per square mile (65.1/km^{2}). The racial makeup of the CDP was 93.88% White, 0.47% African American, 0.47% Native American, 1.42% Asian, 0.09% Pacific Islander, 1.71% from other races, and 1.96% from two or more races. Hispanic or Latino of any race were 5.58% of the population.

There were 1,587 households, out of which 43.9% had children under the age of 18 living with them, 77.1% were married couples living together, 4.2% had a female householder with no husband present, and 16.3% were non-families. 10.3% of all households were made up of individuals, and 0.8% had someone living alone who was 65 years of age or older. The average household size was 2.80 and the average family size was 3.03.

In the CDP, the population was spread out, with 29.4% under the age of 18, 4.0% from 18 to 24, 41.9% from 25 to 44, 21.8% from 45 to 64, and 2.9% who were 65 years of age or older. The median age was 34 years. For every 100 females, there were 104.6 males. For every 100 females age 18 and over, there were 103.5 males.

The median income for a household in the CDP was $78,607, and the median income for a family was $81,281. Males had a median income of $51,543 versus $35,968 for females. The per capita income for the CDP was $36,300. About 2.0% of families and 1.7% of the population were below the poverty line, including 1.2% of those under age 18 and none of those age 65 or over.

The United States Census Bureau initially defined the Roxborough Park CDP for the United States Census 2000.

Roxborough Park CDP, Colorado
Year	Pop.	±%
2000	4,446	—
2010	9,099	+104.7%
2020	9,416	+3.5%
Source: United States Census Bureau

=== 2020 census ===
As of the 2020 census, Roxborough Park had a population of 9,416. The median age was 42.0 years. 23.9% of residents were under the age of 18 and 14.6% of residents were 65 years of age or older. For every 100 females there were 100.7 males, and for every 100 females age 18 and over there were 99.8 males age 18 and over.

95.5% of residents lived in urban areas, while 4.5% lived in rural areas.

There were 3,374 households in Roxborough Park, of which 36.0% had children under the age of 18 living in them. Of all households, 75.3% were married-couple households, 10.0% were households with a male householder and no spouse or partner present, and 10.1% were households with a female householder and no spouse or partner present. About 11.6% of all households were made up of individuals and 3.7% had someone living alone who was 65 years of age or older.

There were 3,449 housing units, of which 2.2% were vacant. The homeowner vacancy rate was 0.7% and the rental vacancy rate was 3.4%.

Racial composition as of the 2020 census
Race	Number	Percent
White	7,928	84.2%
Black or African American	55	0.6%
American Indian and Alaska Native	77	0.8%
Asian	197	2.1%
Native Hawaiian and Other Pacific Islander	10	0.1%
Some other race	192	2.0%
Two or more races	957	10.2%
Hispanic or Latino (of any race)	914	9.7%

== Education ==
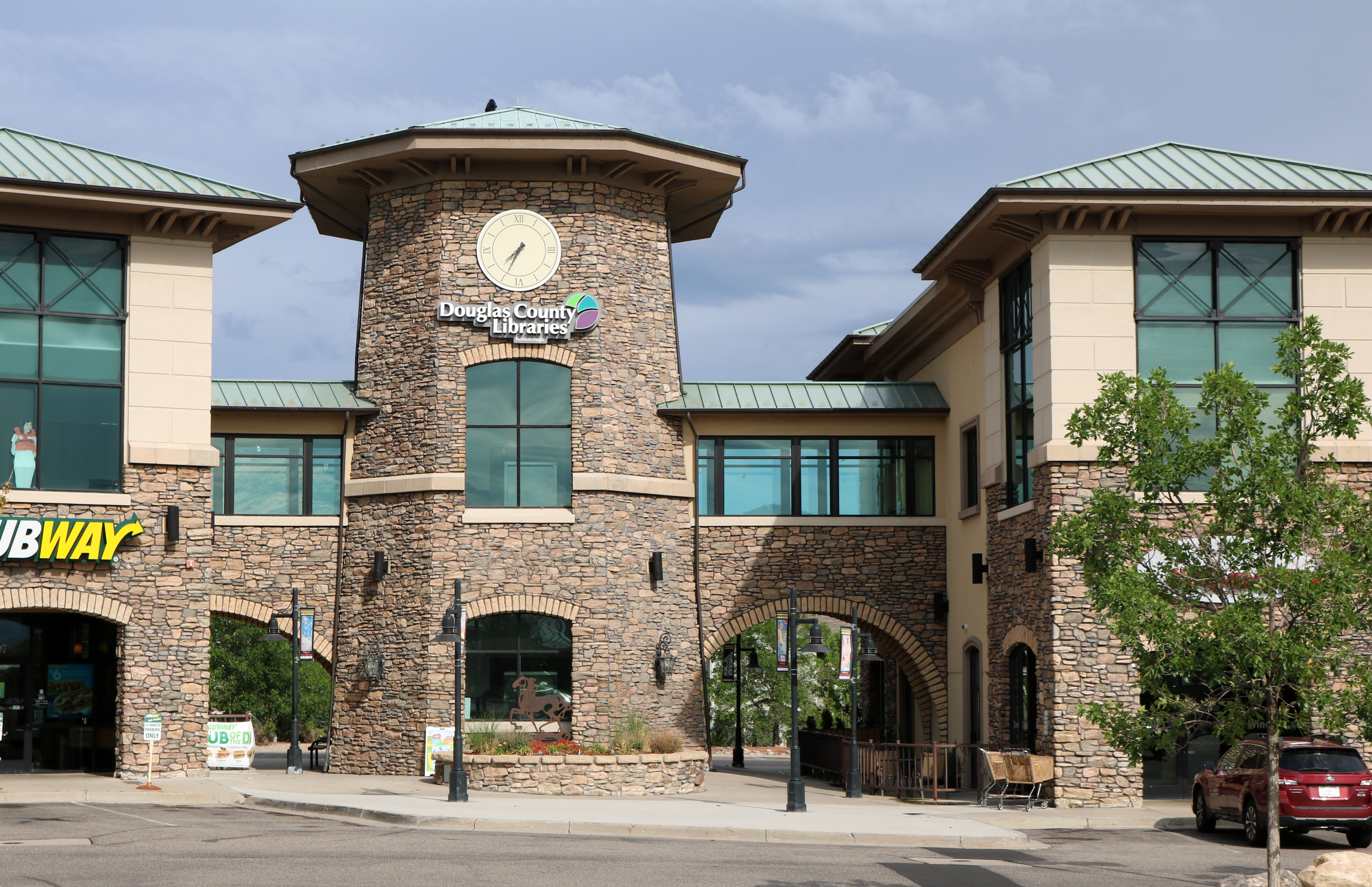
The Roxborough branch of Douglas County Libraries.

The Douglas County School District serves Roxborough Park.

== Places of interest ==
Roxborough is situated next to Pike National Forest, two state parks and an several of recreational opportunities. It is also host to historical and archaeological sites. Roxborough State Park is to the south, with abundant wildlife, red rock formations and connections to multiple trail systems. Chatfield State Park is slightly farther to the north, with boating, fishing, camping, horseback riding, an off-leash dog park, remote-control flying field and an extensive trail system. Waterton Canyon (on the South Platte River) and the High Line Canal are owned by Denver Water and offer a road and trail system for hikers, runners, cyclists and equestrians.

In 1960, while digging a pond, Charles Lamb discovered Columbian mammoth remains on what is now Lamb Spring, the site of one of the largest collection of mammoth bones in the state.

Arrowhead Golf Club is one of the most scenic golf courses in the Greater Denver area, and a popular venue for weddings and events.

== See also ==
- Dakota Hogback
- Roxborough State Park
- Pike National Forest
