= Roxborough State Park Archaeological District =

Archaeological site in Colorado, United States

- U.S. National Register of Historic Places
- U.S. Historic district
- Colorado State Register of Historic Properties
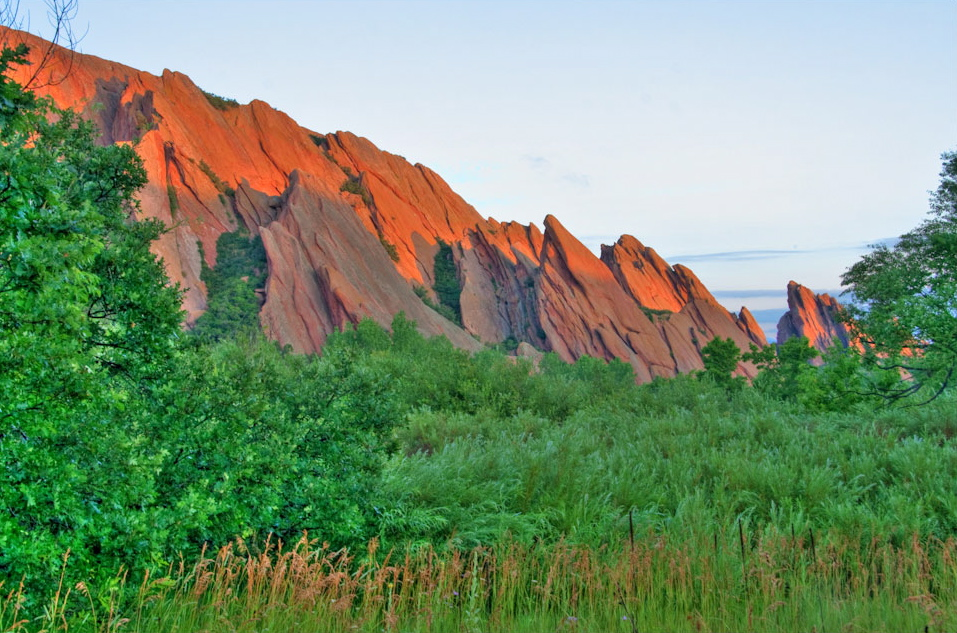
- Red rocks at Roxborough State Park

- Location within Colorado Location within the United States
- Nearest city: Littleton
- Coordinates: 39°26′23″N 105°04′04″W
- NRHP reference No.: 83001316
- CSRHP No.: 5DA.343
- Added to NRHP: 1983

Roxborough State Park Archaeological District is located in Douglas County, Colorado. Roxborough State Park, 25 miles (40 km) south of Denver, Colorado, is a Colorado State Park day park. Archaeological artifacts reflect that there were prehistoric hunter-gatherers who lived or camped, made tools from stone quarries, and farmed in the Roxborough State Park area.

Early native people inhabited the area between 5000 BC and 1000 AD and again from 1900 to 1924 AD. Roxborough State Park Archaeological District was added to the list of National Register of Historic Places in 1983.

== Geography ==
The Archaeological District is located within the 3,299-acre Roxborough State Park, a Colorado State Park known for dramatic red sandstone formations. In 1980, it was recognized as a National Natural Landmark because of the number of ecological systems and geological formations. It is also a State Historic Site and National Cultural District because of the number of archaeological sites.

Several ecosystems are found at Roxborough: forests of ponderosa pine and Douglas fir, prairie, and woodlands that support many forms of wildlife. There are 145 bird, over 50 butterfly and moth, and 11 amphibian and reptile species. Animals commonly found in the park include black bear, coyote, deer, elk, fox, prairie dog and rabbit. Sources of water include Little Willow Creek, Willow Creek and Mill Gulch. Elevations range from 5,900 to 7,280 feet (1,800 to 2,220 m).

== History ==
Within the Denver Basin, prehistoric time periods are traditionally identified as: Paleo-Indian, Archaic and Woodland (Ceramic) periods. The Denver basin is a geological definition of a portion of the Colorado Piedmont from Colorado Springs to Wyoming. The Palmer Divide, with elevations from 6,000 to 7,500, is a subsection of that area that separates the South Platte River watershed from that of the Arkansas River. It runs perpendicular to the Rocky Mountains and divides the Denver metropolitan area from the southern Pikes Peak area.

=== Paleo-Indians ===
Paleo-Indians (9550-5850 BC) were primarily hunters of large mammals, such as the large Bison antiquus. This period occurred at the end of the Ice Age, when there was significant glacial run-off so that much of the land was covered by lakes and savannas. As this period of time ended, the land dried up into desert, and people had to adapt. The changes resulted in the Archaic period, when people became hunters of smaller mammals and gatherers.

=== Archaic period ===
People of the Archaic period (5850-3050 BC) were hunters of smaller game, such as deer, antelope and rabbits, and gatherers of wild plants. The people moved seasonally to hunting and gathering sites. Late in the Archaic period, about 200-500 AD, corn was introduced into the diet and the making of pottery for storing food became an occupation.

Archaic people built structures with stone walls. The Roxborough residents accessed two quarries within Roxborough's Hogback region to create tools in the early Archaic period through later periods. There were a number of quarries found within Roxborough that, depending upon the site, contained jasper, opal, petrified wood and quartzite.

=== Woodland period ===
The groups of people during the Woodland period (500-1000 AD) became much more diverse, were more likely to settle in a location or a couple of locations, cultivate, domesticate animals, make pottery and baskets, and perform ceremonial rituals.

=== Archaeological findings ===
The Colorado Archaeological Society, Denver Chapter, conducted the first archaeological study in 1977. Another archaeological study was completed in 2000 to further research known sites and explore unstudied acquired land. On County Road 18 within the Roxborough State Park are 12 archaeological sites of nomadic Paleo-Indians and Native Americans, as well as some artifacts from early European American settlers in the Stagecoach area.

Archaeological surveys have shown that people lived for periods of time during the Paleo-Indian, Archaic and Woodland prehistoric periods. Over time, the lifestyle transitioned from one that primarily hunted bison to a culture that farmed, created its own goods, traded and developed a complex society.

Trade by the ancient culture is suggested by the presence of catlinite pipe pieces at both the Franktown Cave and Roxborough sites. Catlinite is indigenous to Minnesota. The majority of artifacts, though, were from the late Archaic and Woodland periods. While at Roxborough, people lived in protected areas near water. Based upon their use of south and western facing shelters, it is conjectured that they wintered in the area. Ancient people who lived or traveled through the land were ancestors to Apache, Arapaho, Cheyenne, Comanche and Ute tribes. Utes used the Stagecoach area for summer hunting grounds and passed through the area to their northern grounds. Their trails became County Roads 14 and 18.

== See also ==
- National Register of Historic Places listings in Douglas County, Colorado
- List of prehistoric sites in Colorado
