= Tristan Klewsaat =

American floorball player

Personal information
- Nationality: United States
- Born: October 21, 1997 (age 27) Larkspur, Colorado, United States

Sport
- Sport: Floorball
- Position: Forward
- Shoots: Right
- Team: United States national floorball team

Tristan Klewsaat (born October 21, 1997) is an American floorball player who plays as a forward. He has won two caps for the United States national floorball team.

== Career statistics ==
=== International ===
Appearances, goals, assists, and points by national team and year
National team	Year	Apps	Goals	Assists	Points
United States	2019	2	0	0	0
Total		2	0	0	0
