= Fountain Formation =

American geological formation

- Stratigraphic range: Late Pennsylvanian
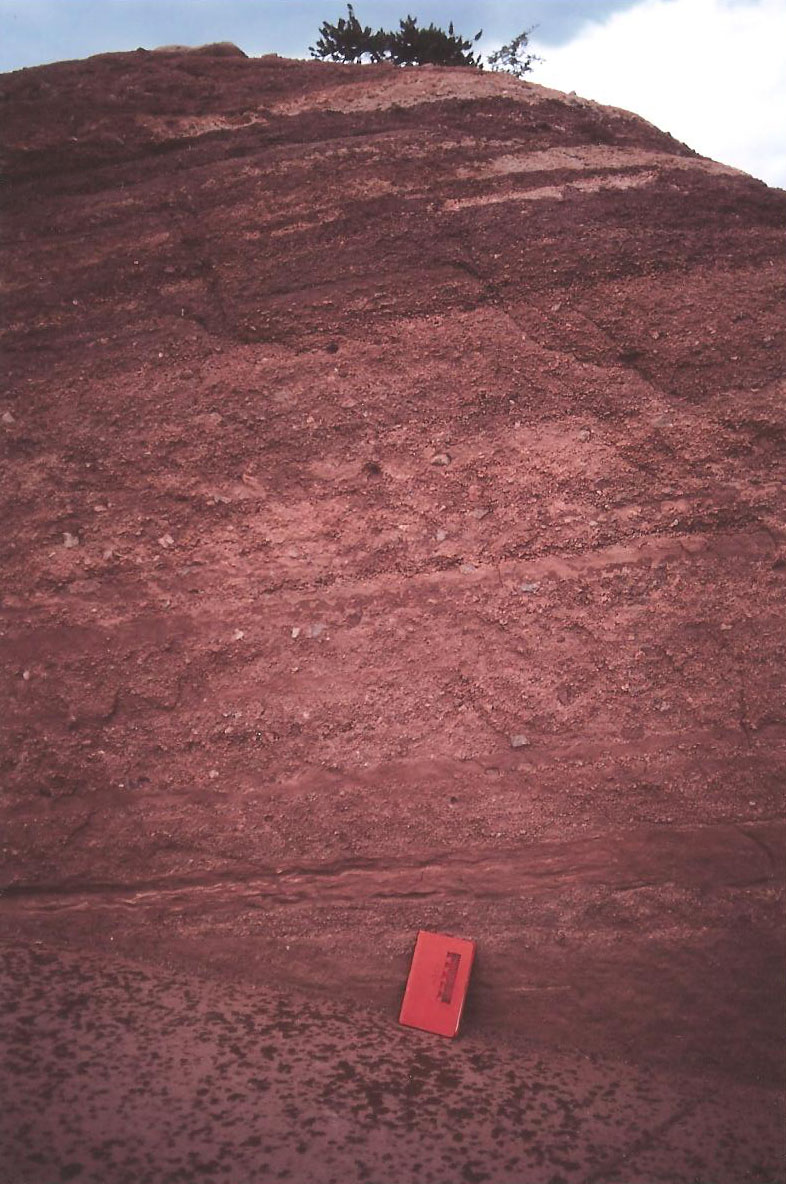
- Outcrop of the Fountain Formation at Garden of the Gods. Scale bar on notebook is 10 centimetres (3.9 in)
- Type: sedimentary
- Underlies: Lyons Formation
- Overlies: Gleneyrie Formation
- Thickness: 0–4,500 feet (0–1,372 m)

Lithology
- Primary: sandstone, conglomerate
- Other: limestone, shale

Location
- Region: Denver Basin
- Extent: Colorado, Wyoming

Type section
- Named for: Fountain Creek
- Named by: C. W. Cross, 1894

The Fountain Formation is a Pennsylvanian bedrock unit consisting primarily of conglomerate, sandstone, or arkose, in the states of Colorado and Wyoming in the United States, along the east side of the Front Range of the Rocky Mountains, and along the west edge of the Denver Basin.

== Origin of name ==
The Fountain Formation was named by geologist C. W. Cross in 1894 for exposures along Fountain Creek in El Paso County, Colorado.

== Stratigraphy ==
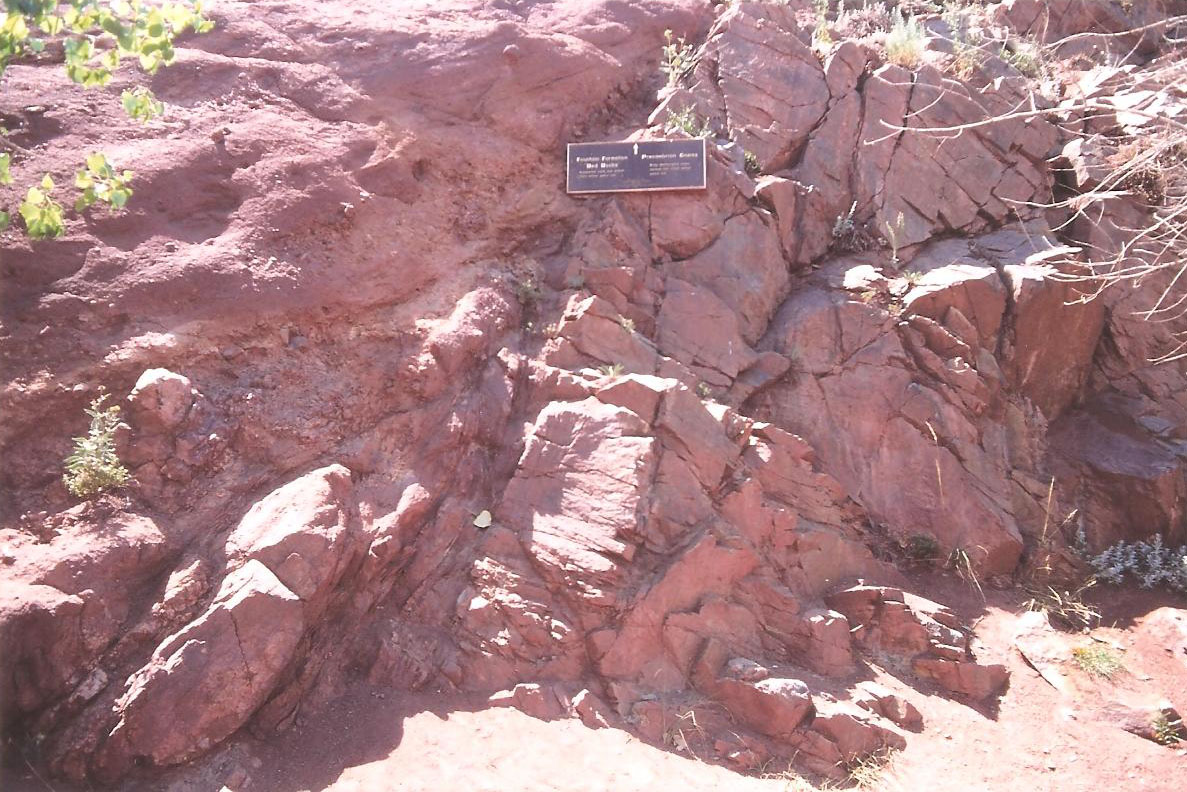
Fountain Formation unconformably overlying Precambrian rocks at the parking lot of Red Rocks Park

The Fountain Formation is found along the Front Range of Colorado. To the north, the Formation unconformably overlies Precambrian granite and gneiss. To the south, it overlies Mississippian, Ordovician and Devonian Limestones, as well as Cambrian sandstones. Outcrops of the formation typically dip steeply to the east.

=== Depositional environment ===
The formation was formed by the erosion of the Ancestral Rocky Mountains, and deposition by fluvial processes as alluvial fans. The characteristic predominant red color and the composition of the Fountain reflect that of the granites and gneisses from which it was eroded.

=== Notable outcrops ===
- Flagstaff Mtn Park, near Boulder, Colorado
- Flatirons, near Boulder, Colorado
- Red Rocks Park and Amphitheater, Morrison, Colorado
- Roxborough State Park, south of Denver, Colorado
- Perry Park, west of Larkspur, Colorado
- Garden of the Gods in Colorado Springs, Colorado
- Red Rock Canyon Open Space in Colorado Springs, Colorado
- Red Canyon Park near Cañon City, Colorado

=== Fossils ===
Marine invertebrates have been discovered in a limestone and shale member of the Fountain Formation, cropping out on a low hogback in Perry Park. Invertebrates include bryozoans, brachiopods, crinoids, echinoids, and gastropods.

Plant fossils have been discovered in Garden Park north of Cañon City, including Lepidophloios laricinus, Sigillaria, Syringodendron sp., Lepidophyloides sp., Lepidostrobus sp., Lepidostrobophyllum sp., Calamites, Neuropterus sp., Cyclopteris sp., and Stigmaria ficoides.

== Age ==
Rocks of the Fountain Formation are considered to be of Late Pennsylvanian age, and are between 290 and 340 million years old.
