= Lyons Formation =

Lyons Sandstone
- Stratigraphic range: Middle Permian
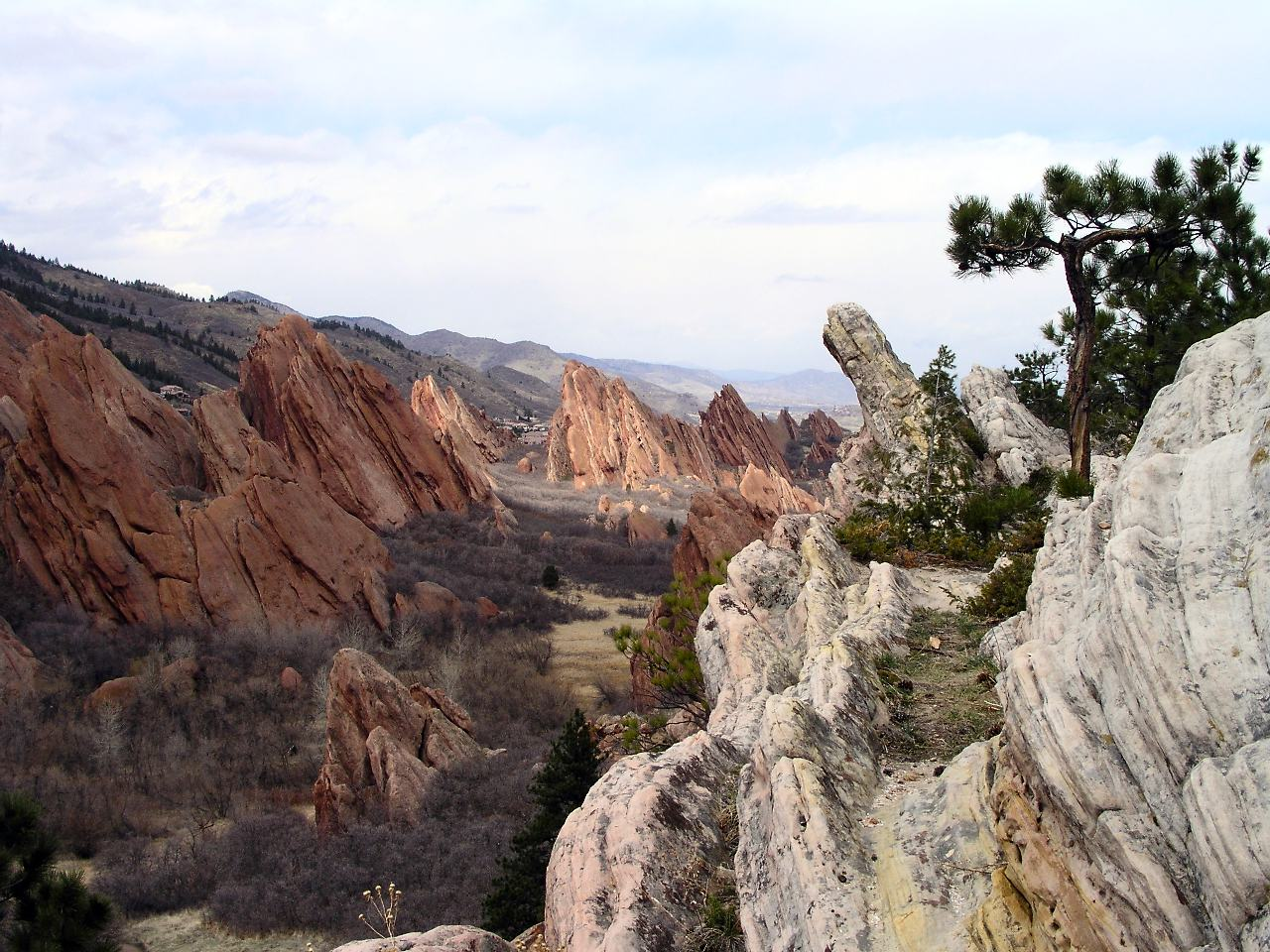
- Buff and pink rocks typical of the Lyons Formation seen on the right at Roxborough State Park near Littleton, Colorado
- Type: sedimentary
- Underlies: Lykins Formation
- Overlies: Fountain Formation
- Thickness: 50-220 ft

Lithology
- Primary: sandstone, conglomerate

Location
- Region: Denver Basin
- Extent: Colorado, Wyoming

Type section
- Named for: Lyons, Colorado

Lyons Sandstone is a geological layer formed during the Paleozoic Era, Middle Permian Period about 250 million years ago. This layer is also referred to as the Lyons Formation. It is the result of fine-grained quartz sand dunes compressing into sandstone. This layer is visible along the Front Range of the Colorado Rocky Mountains.
