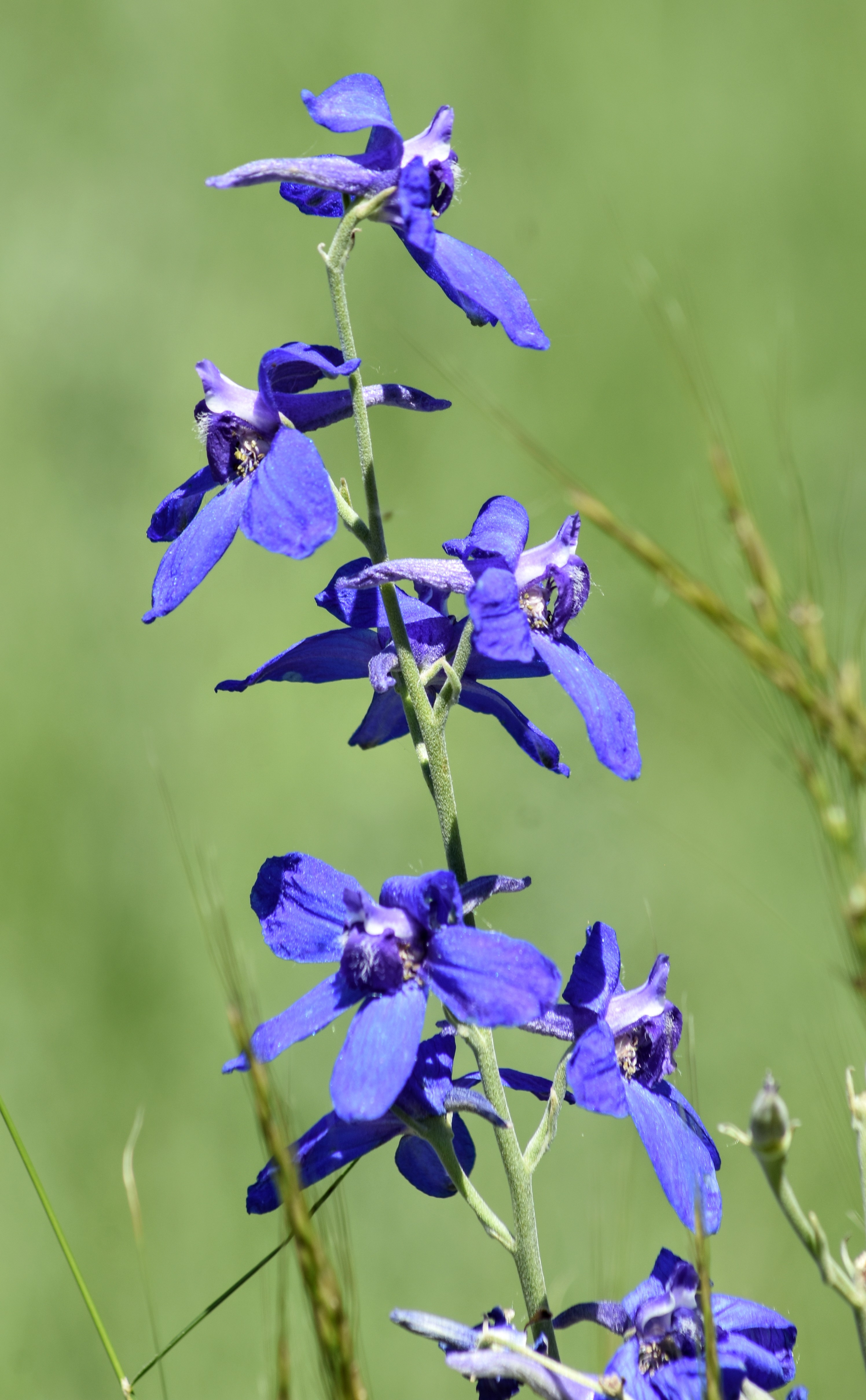

Conservation status
- Secure (NatureServe)

Scientific classification
- Kingdom: Plantae
- Clade: Tracheophytes
- Clade: Angiosperms
- Clade: Eudicots
- Order: Ranunculales
- Family: Ranunculaceae
- Genus: Delphinium
- Species: D. geyeri

Binomial name
- Delphinium geyeri Greene
- Delphinium geyeri range map, estimated with the iNaturalist Geomodel, 2025

Synonyms
- Delphinium geyeri f. viscidum (Rydb.) Ewan; Delphinium viscidum Rydb.

= Delphinium geyeri =

Species of flowering plant

Delphinium geyeri is a species of plant in the Ranunculaceae family that is often called by the common names plains larkspur and foothills larkspur. It is infamous for causing the deaths of cattle grazing in the spring because it is especially poisonous before it flowers and so it is also called poisonweed by ranchers. It is a medium to tall plant that has very striking blue flowers and is occasionally grown in native plant gardens for this reason. It grows mainly in Wyoming with large population in northern Colorado, northeastern Utah, and parts of Nebraska.

== Description ==
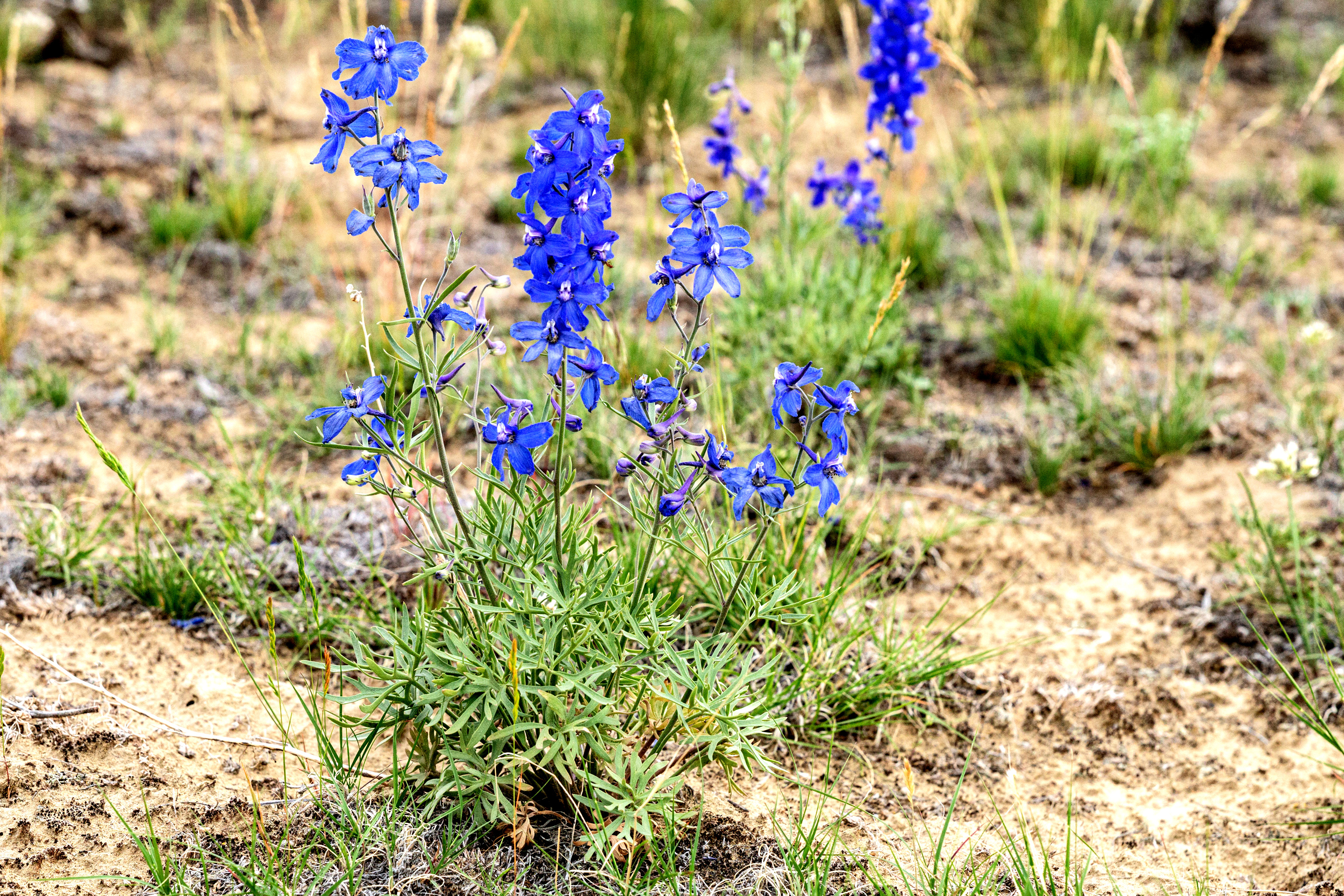
Delphinium geyeri photographed in Wyoming

Delphinium geyeri is a medium sized herbaceous plant, most often growing 30 to 60 centimeters (12 to 24 in) tall in the flowering stage, though occasionally it will reach 80 centimeters (31 in) in height or be stunted to just 15 centimeters (5.9 in). The base of the flowering stem is usually reddish in color and covered in fine hairs (puberulent). Unlike with the stems of Aconitum (monkshood), the stems are not hollow. The placement of leaves is variable; plants sometimes have basal leaves when entering into flowering and other times do not. Likewise, they may have 4–22 leaves on the flowering stem. Plants will develop several thick, tuberous and fibrous roots that grow downward from the crown of the plant.

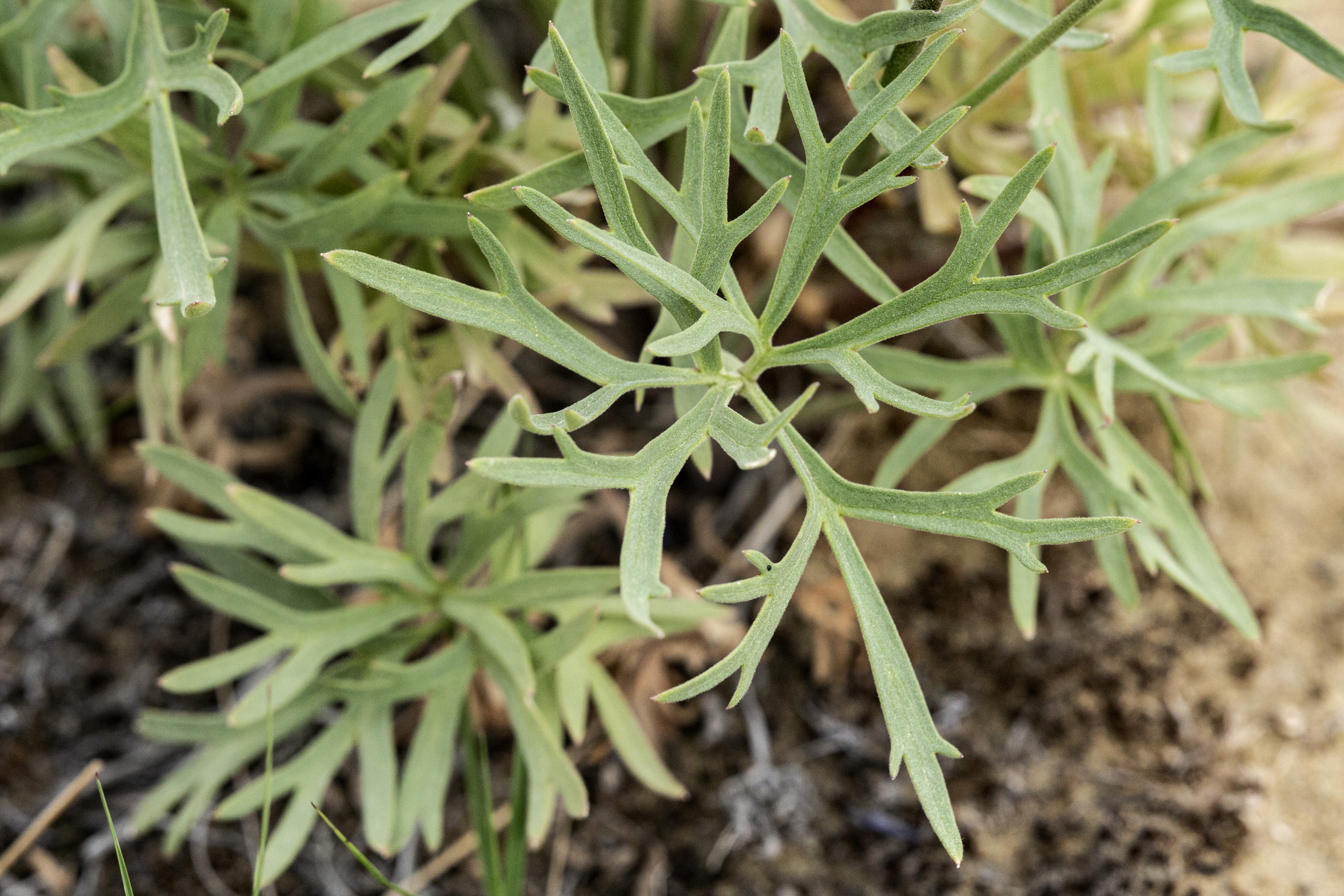
Leaves Delphinium geyeri photographed in Wyoming

The leaves of Delphinium geyeri are roughly round in outline, but deeply divided into 7–20 pointed lobes that are 1–6 centimeters (0.39–2.4 in) wide. The end lobes of the leaves are 2–5 mm wide on basal leaves and 2–4 mm wide on flower stem leaves. As with the stem, the leaves are covered in fine hairs and are light green in color. The similarly split leaves of Geraniums such as Geranium caespitosum are sometimes mistaken for those of D. geyeri, but they have much shallower leaf divisions and greater leaf area. The leaves develop earlier than many other plants in its habitat. The narrower and greater number of leaf divisions help to distinguish D. geyeri from other western tall larkspurs.

Each inflorescence can have as many as 60 flowers or as few as 6, but usually not more than 30. The flowers have bright blue sepals that are covered in very fine hairs. The sepals at the side spread 10–18 mm and are 4–8 mm in width. The spurs on the rear of the flowers are 11–16 mm long. There are dense hairs on the folded structure at center of the flower, which is white to light yellow in color. The exposed stamens are 4–8 mm in length. The blooming period is from May to July. The four true petals are smaller and less conspicuous than the much larger sepals.

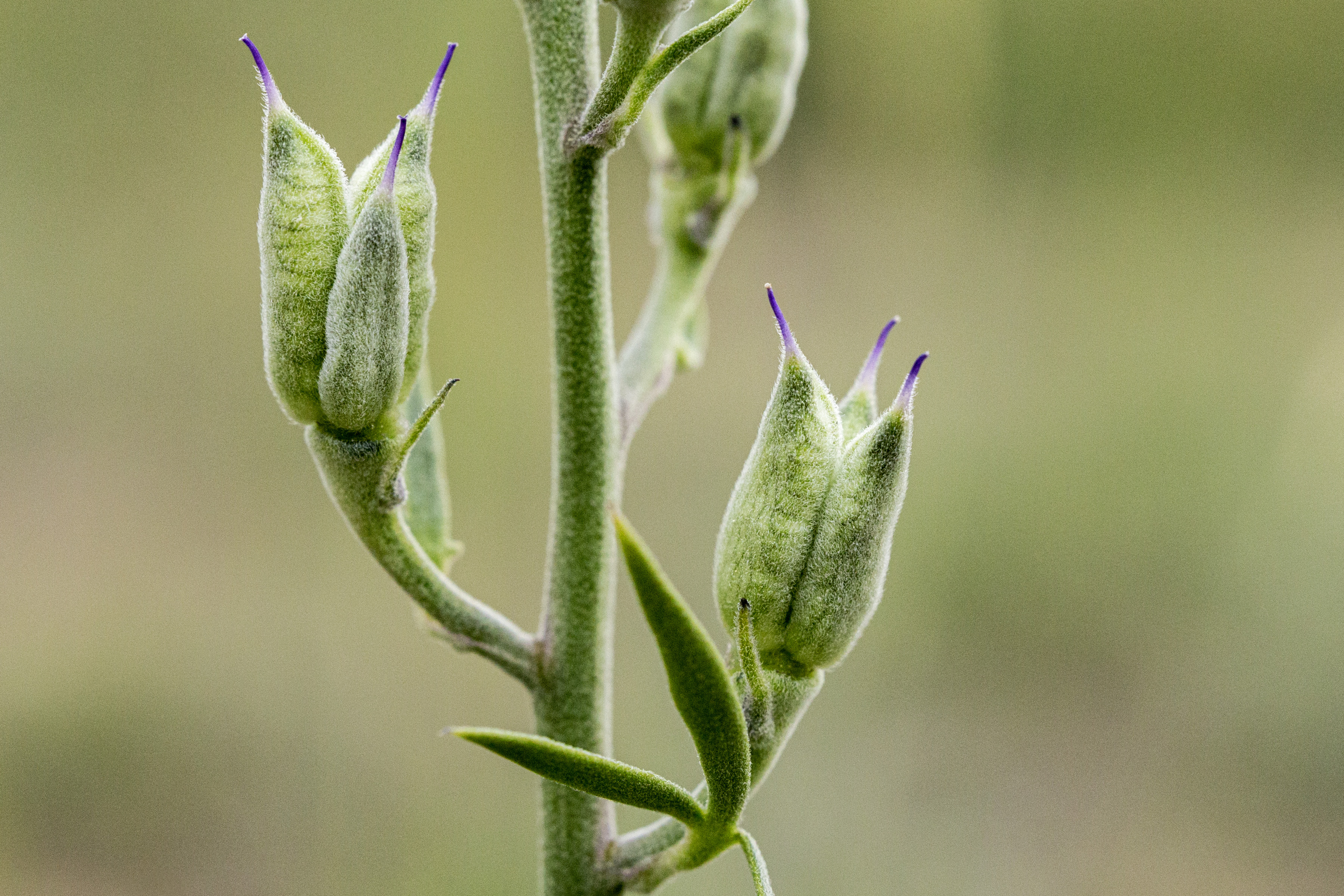
Unripe seed capsules

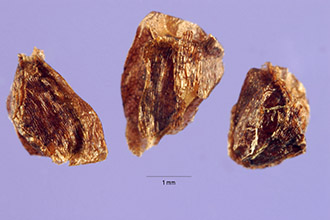
Seeds

The fruits are capsules 11–15 mm long and 3–3.5 times as long as they are wide. As with other parts of the plant they are covered in sparse, fine hairs. The small seeds are uncoated.

== Taxonomy ==
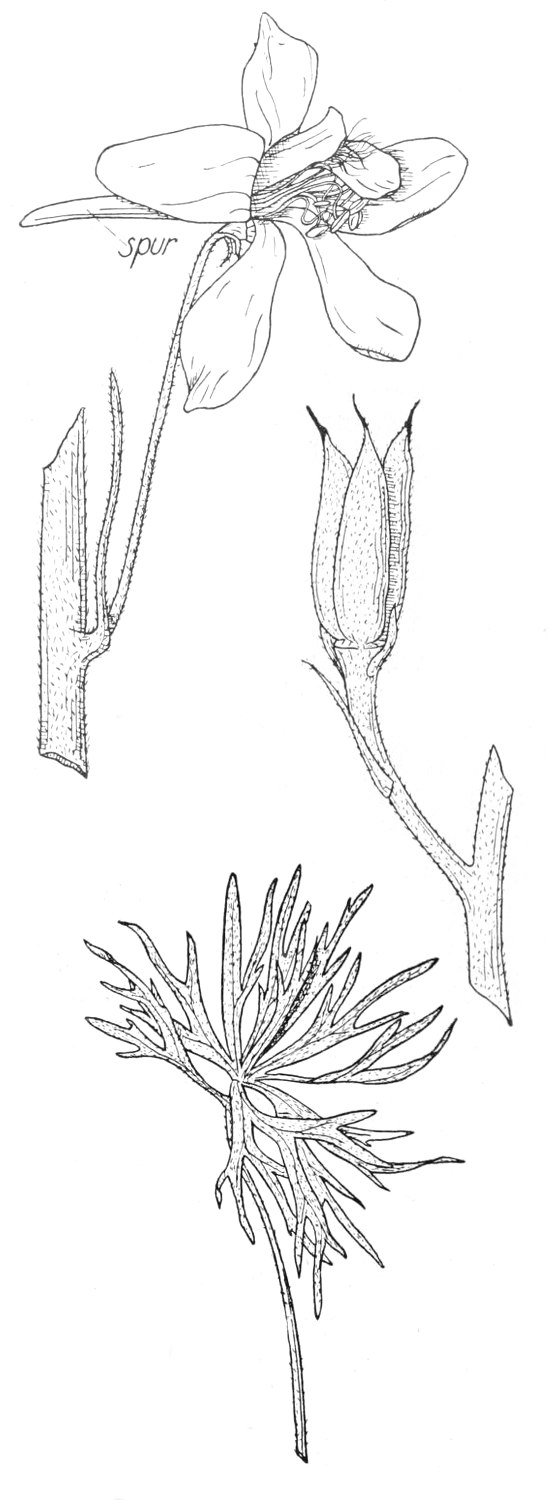
Illustration of the flower, seed pod, and leaf of Delphinium geyeri, 1887

Though growing in areas that were visited by botanists and scientific expeditions from the early 1800s, Delphinium geyeri was not described as a separate species until 1894. The first scientific description was published in the second volume of the journal Erythea and is credited to the botanist Edward Lee Greene. Greene reported that it was first collected by Thomas Nuttall, but tentatively identified as "D. bicolor?" on the specimen's label despite the great differences between it and Delphinium bicolor. It was also collected by Karl Andreas Geyer between the Kansas and Platte Rivers. He labeled it and many other species as D. azureum. In 1912 the botanist Per Axel Rydberg described a specimen collected in Wyoming as a separate species named Delphinium viscidum in the Bulletin of the Torrey Botanical Club. This and the 1945 description by Joseph Ewan as a subspecies of Delphinium geyeri were not widely accepted and are universally considered taxonomic synonyms.

It is very similar to and probably a relative of the Pacific Northwestern species Delphinium stachydeum, but has smaller flowers and generally blooms earlier.

=== Names ===
Delphinium geyeri has many common names related to its habitat, poisonous character, or its scientific name. It is called "foothills larkspur" in Colorado. However, it also grows on the plains and so it is also sometimes called "plains larkspur", though this name common name is shared with the white-flowered Delphinium carolinianum subsp. virescens. For its highly toxic nature it is also given the common name "poisonweed". Its other common name, "Geyer's larkspur", relates to the scientific name Delphinium geyeri given by Greene to honor the botanist Karl Andreas Geyer. However, the writer Roger Williams relates that there is speculation in the botanical community about a possible satirical intent of Greene naming a poisonous plant for a botanist who was regarded by many peers as having a toxic personality. Though he does note there are other poisonous plants named by Greene for botanists that do not seem to have any intended commentary on their professional or personal qualities.

== Distribution and habitat ==
Delphinium geyeri has a limited distribution, only consistently reported to grow in four western US states: Colorado, Nebraska, Utah, and Wyoming. In Colorado it is known from four Front Range and plains counties, Jefferson, Boulder, Larimer, and Weld, as well as three western counties, Jackson, Grand, and Moffat. In Wyoming it is widely distributed across most of the state. In Utah it grows in four north eastern counties, Summit, Daggett, Duchesne, and Uintah. While in Nebraska there are no county level distributions recorded. It may also grow in the state of Montana, but its status is uncertain. D. geyeri grows between 1,400 metres (4,600 ft) and 3,000 metres (9,800 ft) in elevation.

Within its range it is a common plant of the rocky hillsides, sandy places, shortgrass prairie, mountain brush, and sagebrush covered slopes. In 1988 NatureServe evaluated Delphinium geyeri as globally secure (G5). At the state level, it was not evaluated in Colorado, evaluated as critically imperiled (S1) in Nebraska, imperiled (S2) in Utah, and apparently secure (G4) in Wyoming.

== Ecology ==
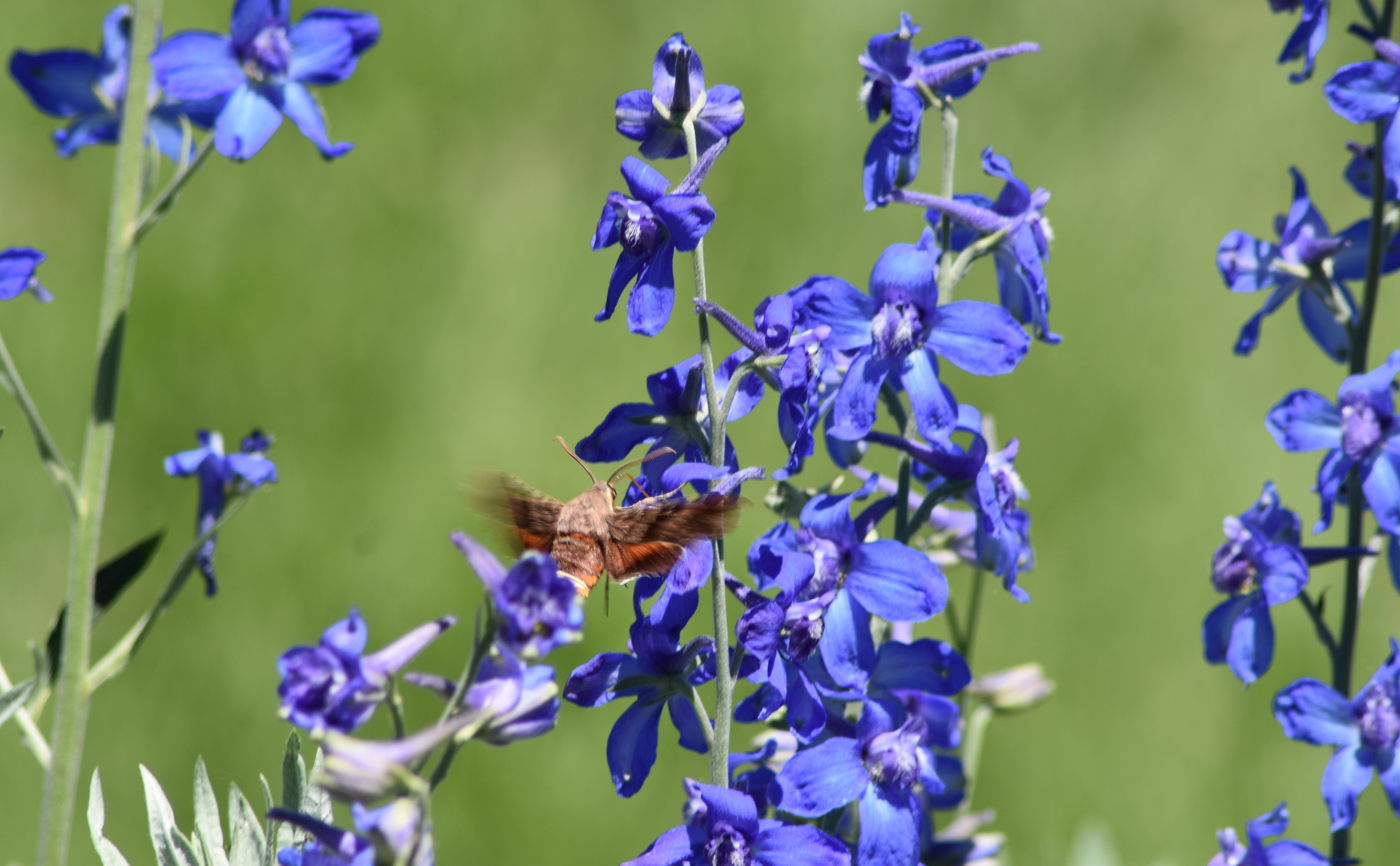
Moth feeding from Delphinium geyeri flowers, Denver Botanic Gardens

The butterflies Papilio zelicaon (Anise Swallowtail) and Erynnis telemachus (Rocky Mountain Duskywing) visit the flowers of Delphinium geyeri. It is seldom fed upon by herbivorous insects like the common grasshopper Melanoplus sanguinipes due to the alkaloid content of its foliage.

== Cultivation ==
The wildflower author Claude A. Barr considered plains larkspur to be "arresting in the intensity and depth of its textured blueness." In gardens it has good drought resistance, but requires good moisture and soil to maximize its bloom. It is on the City of Fort Collins' recommended plant list for its very low water usage and for its value as a nectar source for insects. However, the plants have limited availability in the horticultural trade. Seed germination when planted outside in the fall is 57%, but drops to only 5% if not cold stratified. Plants can be successfully transplanted, though like many plants this is more successful if done while plants are small and in dormancy with plenty of soil around the roots. Plains larkspur is known to be winter hardy in USDA zone 4, a minimum temperature of about −34 °C (−29 °F). Plains larkspur seeds were offered for sale as early as 1916 and regularly through the 1930s by Rockmont Nursery.

== Toxicity ==
Delphinium geyeri is a poisonous plant, though the toxicity of the plant is variable from year to year. It also varies in toxicity during the year with the plant's being most toxic before it flowers. This has been known since at least 1916. The primary toxic agents are browniine, 14-acetylbrowniine, geyerine, and 14-dehydrobrowniine. They also have moderate amounts of delcosine and delphatine as well as minor amounts of dictyocarpine, geyeridine, geyerinine, and glaucenine. With levels of alkaloids in D. geyeri often above 15 milligrams per tenth gram of plant material while concentrations above 3 milligrams being considered dangerous. These alkaloids act on neuromuscular junction causing muscle weakness and paralysis. While highly toxic to both humans and cattle, sheep are resistant to the poisonous principle and ranchers will sometime graze sheep in areas with Delphinium geyeri as a biological control. Horses are also less effected by the poisons in this plant. Average losses to ranchers with cattle grazing in areas where it grows are 5% annually, with a low of 2% and high of 15%. Delphinium geyeri is particularly problematic for cattle because it sprouts early in the spring before many other plants start growing new leaves. Signs of Delphinium poisoning in cattle include muscle weakness, trembling, rapid heart rate, failure of voluntary muscular coordination, inability to breathe, and death.

Most of the research on Delphinium geyeri is on cattle poisoning. Just two years after its 1894 scientific description Aven Nelson wrote that it is, "frequently greedily eaten by hungry cattle with fatal results, caused by bloating." It continues to the 21st century with articles such as "Plains Larkspur (Delphinium geyeri) Grazing by Cattle in Wyoming" and "Toxic Alkaloid Concentrations in Delphinium Nuttallianum, Delphinium Andersonii, and Delphinium Geyeri in the Intermountain Region" representative of research articles.

== Culture ==
The town of Larkspur, Colorado, is named for this flower.
