= Universal Co-Masonry =

International fraternal Masonic organization

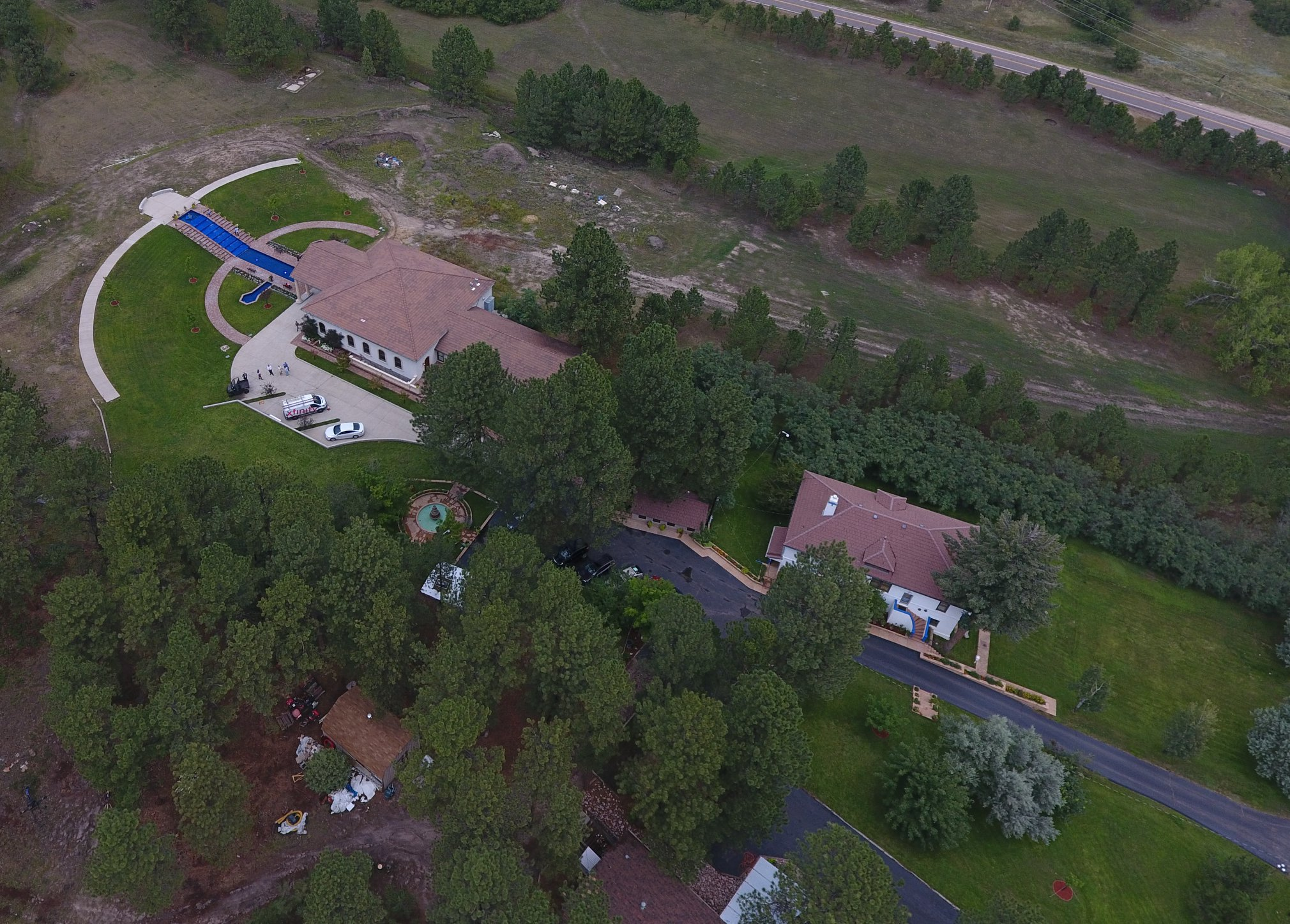
The Larkspur, Colorado Headquarters of Universal Co-Masonry

Universal Co-Masonry (incorporated under the laws of Colorado as The American Federation of Human Rights, A.F.H.R. for short), is an international fraternal Masonic organization headquartered in Larkspur, Colorado. Formally a national Federation of Le Droit Humain, the international order of mixed co-freemasonry, Universal Co-Masonry split off in 1994 to become an independent masonic obedience. The organization seeks to “combat ignorance in all its forms” and works “to the Glory of God and the Perfection of Humanity”. Universal Co-Masonry has created “a Masonic Government that ensures the maximum liberty compatible with a voluntarily accepted discipline and is organized upon the precepts of the Ancient Mystery Schools, the Scottish Rite, and the English Rite”. Universal Co-Masonry is active in North America, South America, and the Philippines. Universal Co-Masonry also oversees the administration of the Masonic Philosophical Society, a philosophical discussion and educational society that meets online and in several countries.

== Philosophy ==
Universal Co-Masonry espouses the idea that all human beings are equal, regardless of race, gender, creed or nationality and does not believe that the privileges of Freemasonry should be restricted on the basis of any of these. Universal Co-Masonry views the teachings and philosophies of Freemasonry and other ancient mystery traditions as being essential for the improvement of human society and works to promote values common to all religions throughout the world.

=== Theosophical influence ===
The Theosophical Society has had a major influence on the development of Co-Masonry. Founded in 1875 by Helena Blavatsky, Henry Olcott and William Quan Judge, the Theosophical Society promoted ideas of religious unity and philosophical exploration, both central tenets of Universal Co-Masonry. Many Theosophists were women and the Society promoted an interest in the symbolism and rituals of Freemasonry and other similar organizations but as women were barred from participating in the male-only Freemasonry popular at that time many of its members were encouraged to join Co-Masonry. One of the most prominent female Theosophists to join the order was Annie Besant, who attracted numerous English and international Theosophists to the organization. By the late 1930s the American Federation of Le Droit Humain was heavily influenced by Theosophical teachings.

=== Headquarters ===
The Headquarters of Universal Co-Masonry is located in Larkspur, Colorado on nearly 250 acres dedicated to the Masonic Work of Co-Masonry. The campus contains an Administrative building, Grand Temple, Dormitories, and Conservatory. The Administration was built in 1924 for sole purpose of supporting the work of Co-Masonry in North America. Today this building houses the Co-Masonic Library and Museum, Archive Rooms, and the Executive Chambers of the 33rd Degree. In 1998, it was recognized and listed on the National Register of Historic Places and awarded Landmark status in 2008.

== History ==
=== Early history, 1903–1939 ===
Universal Co-Masonry was first established in North America under the name The American Federation of Human Rights. It was an affiliate branch of Le Droit Humain, the world's first Co-Masonic organization, which was founded in 1882 in Paris, France. The American Federation of Human Rights, the predecessor to Universal Co-Masonry, was first established in North America by Antoine Muzzarelli, an educator and life-long Freemason, and Louis Goaziou, a French immigrant who had long been active in the industrial labor, women's rights and immigrant movements of Pennsylvania. An anarchist turned socialist, Goaziou believed that there was potential contained within the teachings and philosophies of Co-Masonry to shape a more just society and dedicated his life to its promotion. The American Federation of Human Rights, American Co-Masonry, established its first masonic lodge, Alpha Lodge #301, in Charleroi, Pennsylvania in 1903. In 1916, the organization moved its headquarters to Larkspur, Colorado in order to be more centrally located and establish a retirement center for ageing members.

During the 1920s, American Co-Masonry continued to expand, founding lodge after lodge. It was at this time that Theosophy began to become a significant part of American Co-Masonry, and Louis Goaziou decided that it was in the best interests of the American Federation to maintain a balance between Theosophists and non-Theosophists in the organization. This balance would be maintained until the time of Edith Armour as Grand Commander.

When the stock market crashed in 1929 American Co-Masonry was heavily affected. The organization's membership base had long been poor minors and workers, who were drawn to the organization by its sense of community, and its potential to help organize them. As the Great Depression wore on, many of these members were unable to pay their dues, as their jobs disappeared. Lodges in rural areas began to struggle, and the more wealthy Theosophists became a greater and greater share of the membership, slowly eroding the balance sought by Goaziou. It was during this decade that Louis Goaziou passed, and Edith Armour, a prominent Theosophist, became Grand Commander in 1937.

=== World War Two and aftermath, 1939–1990 ===
During the Nazi invasion of France in World War II the Nazis launched a campaign of repression against all Masonic organizations in the occupied territory. The Supreme Council of Le Droit Humain, the governing body of the institution, went into hiding without having a chance to make arrangements for the future leadership of international Co-Masonry in their absence. In response to this crisis in the international organization, The Most Puissant Grand Commander of the British Federation of Le Droit Humain, suggested to Edith Armour, M.P.G.C. of the American Federation that the two of them set up two temporary Supreme Councils to administer Co-Masonry in several countries while France was under Nazi occupation. Armour agreed, and the Western Supreme Council under Armour administered the Western Hemisphere of International Co-Freemasonry until the liberation of France and the reformation of the Supreme Council of Le Droit Humain in 1945.

After the war and the return of the supreme council, the almost entirely Theosophical American Co-Masonry begin to decline in membership. This was largely tied to the organizations dominance by the Theosophical society, which encouraged the admission of only Theosophists into the ranks. As the Theosophical society began to decline in membership, so too did American Co-Masonry. This decline continued until the mid-1990s.

=== The split from Le Droit Humain, 1990–1994 ===
In the early 1990s, philosophical differences between the French leadership of International Co-Masonry (Le Droit Humain) and the members of the American Federation that had been growing for some time came to a head. The members of the American Federation voted by an overwhelming majority to declare its independence and separate from Le Droit Humain a split that was effected in April 1994. Because The American Federation was incorporated in the United States and was a legally independent corporate entity from Le Droit Humain, this transition was accomplished smoothly and the two organizations parted ways.

=== American Co-Masonry, 1995–2017 ===
After the split, The American Federation of Le Droit Humain created its own Supreme Council headquartered in Larkspur, to replace the Supreme Council of Le Droit Humain. Renaming itself American Co-Masonry the newly independent order also began establishing lodges outside the United States as an independent organization no longer bound by the system of national Federations that Le Droit Humain had used to organize its members. In 2010, the construction of a new Grand Temple was finished in Larkspur, Colorado, the headquarters of the newly formed international organization.

=== Universal Co-Masonry, 2017–present ===
In 2017, the Honorable Order of American Co-Masonry: American Federation of Human Rights changed its name to "The Honorable Order of Universal Co-Masonry: United Federation of Lodges" to better reflect the international character of the order.
