= Colorado Renaissance Festival =

Renaissance fair in Colorado, US

- Genre: Renaissance fair
- Dates: Late spring to mid summer
- Locations: Larkspur, Colorado
- Coordinates: 39.22818°N 104.89892°W
- Inaugurated: 1975
- Attendance: 250,000 (average)
- Area: 60 acres (240,000 m^{2}) with 338 acres of camping grounds
- Stages: 10
- Website: coloradorenaissance.com

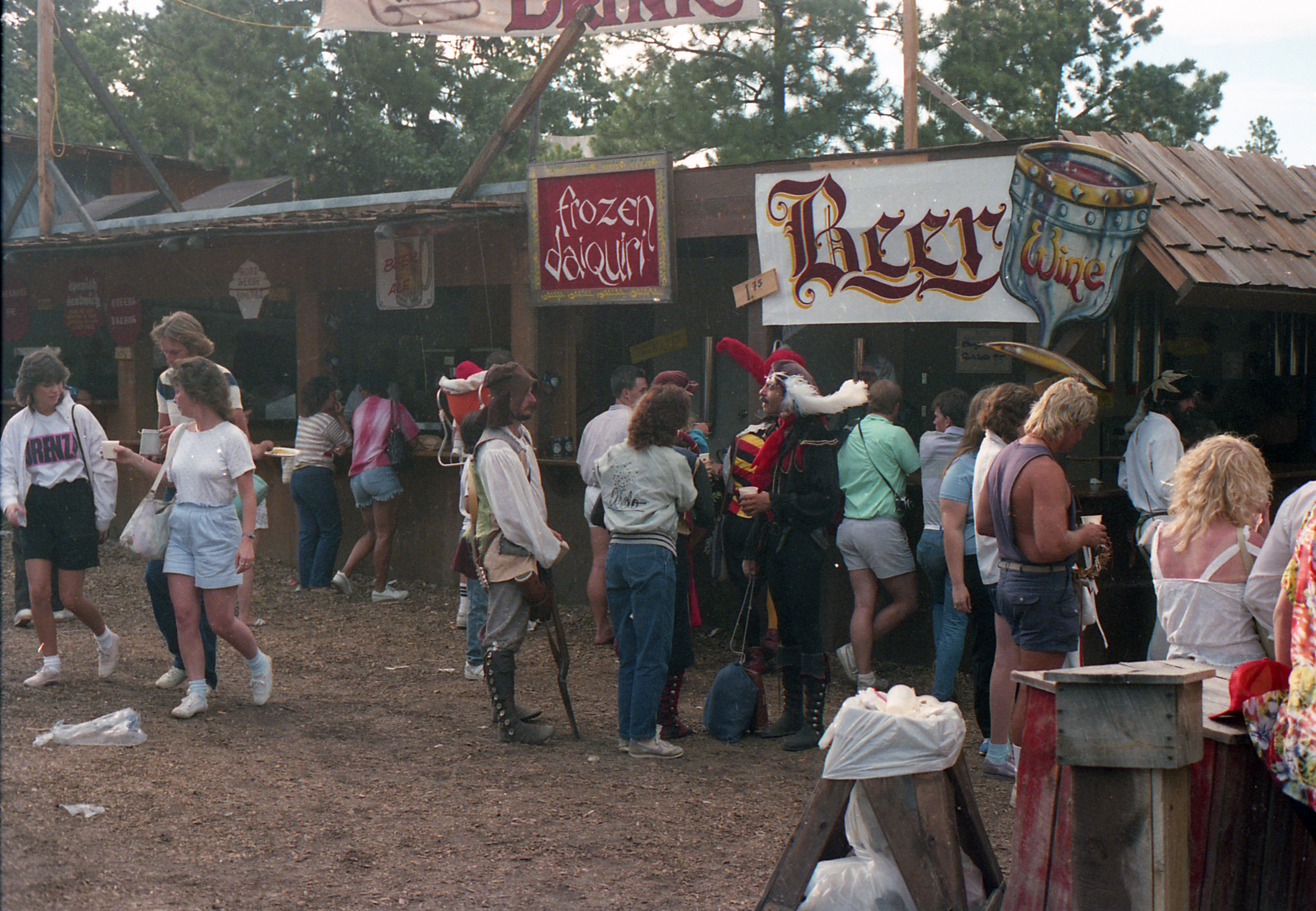
Colorado Renaissance Festival, 1985

The Colorado Renaissance Festival is a Renaissance fair in Colorado located in Larkspur, Colorado, 39 miles (63 kilometers) south of Denver and 32 miles (51 kilometers) north of Colorado Springs. The Renaissance Festival typically runs between the months of June and August. It is based on a 16th-century Tudor village.

It is located at 650 Perry Park Avenue, Larkspur CO 80118.

== History ==
The renaissance festival was begun in 1975 as a tear-down event in Morrison, Colorado, with 60 artisan booths. After two years, the grounds moved to Castle Rock before settling in its current location of Larkspur. It was founded by a man named Jim Paradise. His son, Jim Paradise Jr. is the current director of the fair.

Part or all of the Festival's current property in Larkspur was purchased from the historic American Federation of Human Rights Headquarters, which remains adjacent, in 1975.

The 2020 season of the festival was canceled due to the COVID-19 pandemic, with the 46th edition of the festival deferred to 2021.

== Features ==
The festival features over 200 artisan shops and hundreds of costumed performers. The festival also hosts weddings in accordance to the themed weekends.

=== Themed Weekends ===
Each of the eight weekends of the festival take on a different theme, influencing the performances, costumes, food, drink, art, shops, contests, and games throughout the festival grounds.

- Opening Weekend! Children's Weekend
- Magical Fantasy Weekend
- Royal Ale & Art Festival
- Celtic Festival
- Wine Revelry
- Love and Romance
- Pirate Invasion
- Fare Thee Well & Time Travelers Weekend

== See also ==
- Renaissance fair
- List of Renaissance fairs
