= Red Rock Canyon Open Space =

Park area in Colorado Springs, USA

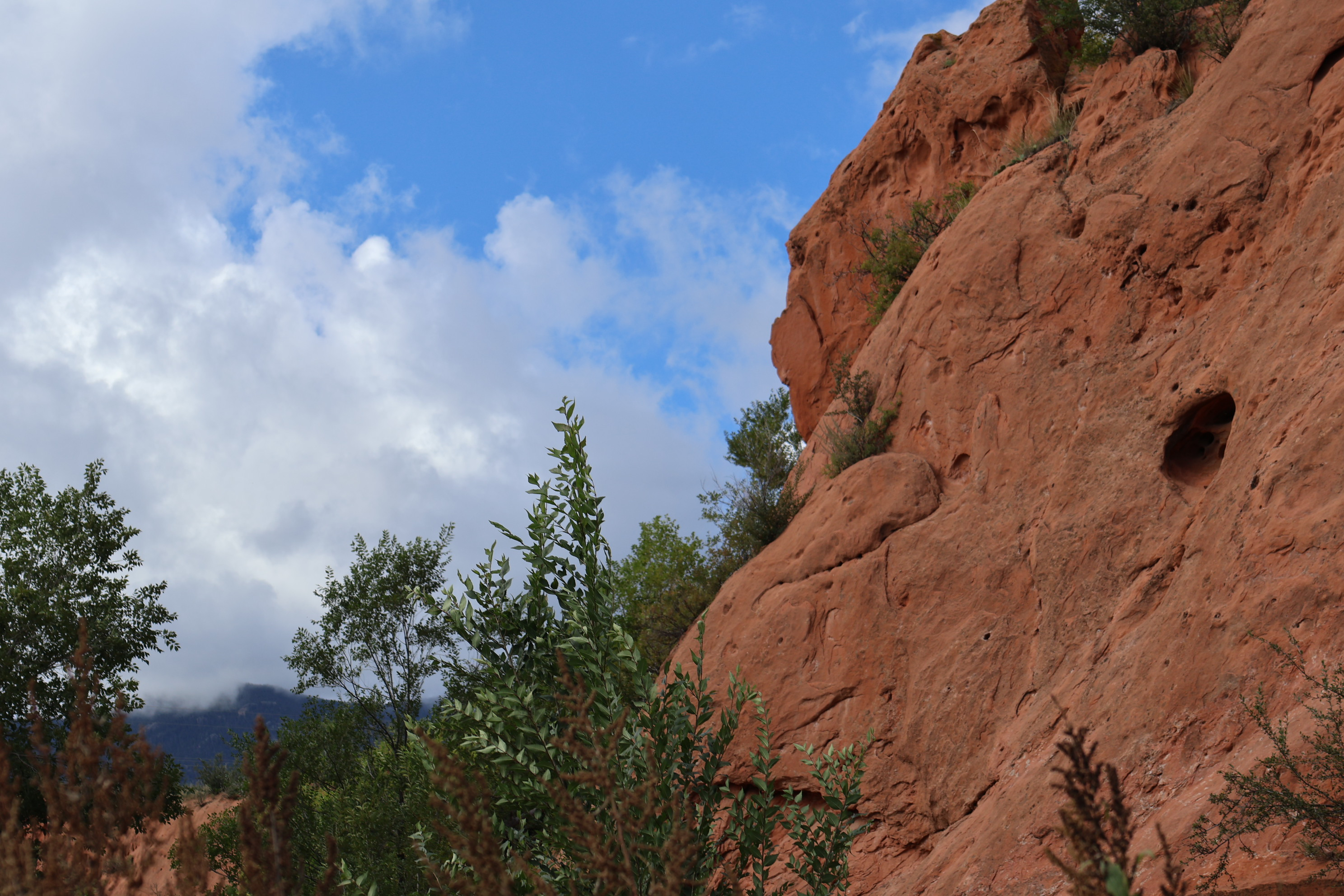
- Red Rock Open Space, located in Colorado Springs, Colorado on September 23, 2025

- Location within Colorado
- Location: Colorado Springs, Colorado, U.S.
- Coordinates: 38°51′10″N 104°52′47″W
- Area: 789 acres (3.19 km^{2})
- Established: 2003
- Governing body: City of Colorado Springs

The Red Rock Canyon Open Space is a 789-acre recreational park first settled in 7000 BC by Native Americans on the western edge of Colorado Springs, Colorado, United States adjacent to Manitou Springs, Colorado. It is situated between the Great Plains and the Front Range in the Southern Rocky Mountains in the Western United States 4 miles west of downtown Olympic City, USA situated at an altitude of 6,500 feet (2,000 meters).

Red Rock Canyon Open Space has several eroded canyons and a series of parallel ridges known as "hogbacks". The parallel ridges are relatively low compared to ordinary ones in the Pikes Peak Region.

In contrast, it includes a continuation of identical sandstone rocks found on geological formations such as Fountain and Lyons that make up the Garden of the Gods about 1.2 miles (1,900 meters) to the north. Most of the other rock formations are associated with the geology of the Colorado Front Range and can be viewed within a suitable and close walking distance.

== Past uses ==
=== Human impact ===
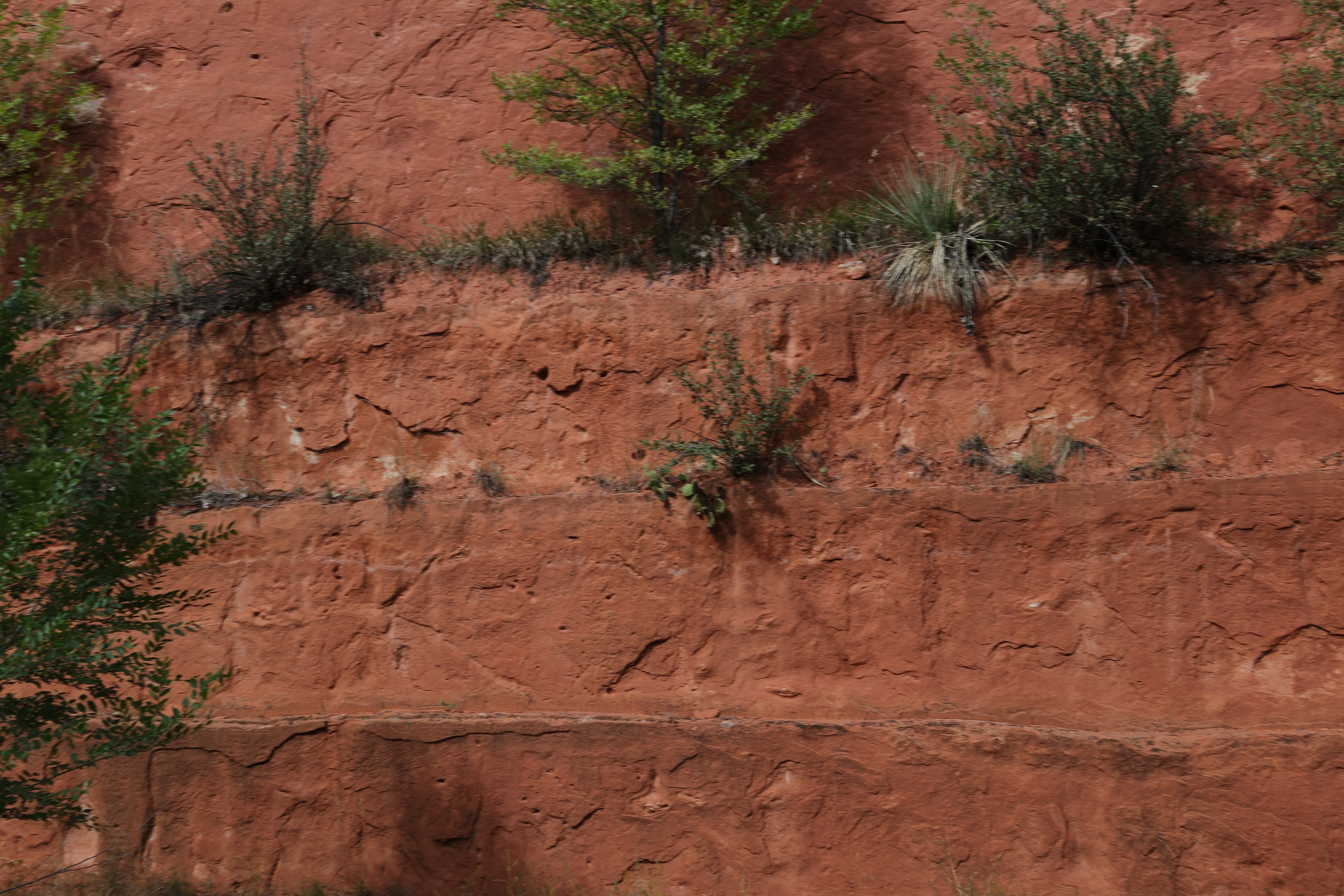
This was caused by mining (2025)

Red Rock Open Space has had multiple human industrial uses, such as serving as an industrial site, a quarry, gravel pit, and a gold refining mill. The park was in addition, a 53-acre (2.3-million-square-foot; 214.5-thousand-square-metre) landfill. The land parcels were purchased piecemeal by John George Bock in the 1920s and 1930s. In 2003 the city of Colorado Springs purchased it and made it into a recreational site.

The most prominent proof from past exploitation of the land are the remains of the Kenmuir Quarry, which produced Lyons sandstone in the late 19th and early 20th centuries, and the Gypsum Canyon landfill, which operated from 1970 to 1986 and remains off-limits to park visitors.

== Trails ==
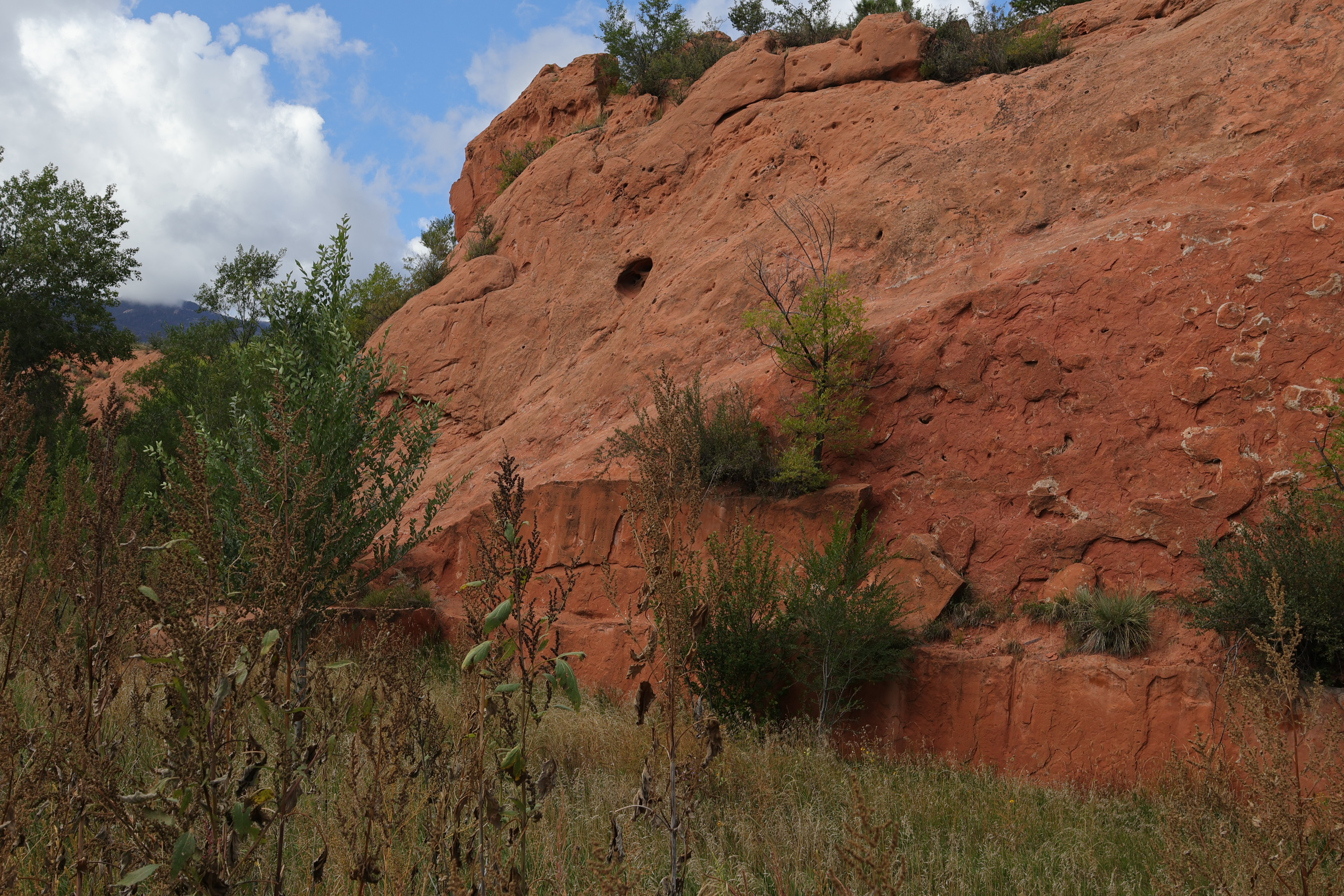
The same formation from another angle (2025)

=== Red Rock Canyon Open Space ===
The park contains many miles of trails of varying difficulty that wind through and around the rock formations, and is popular with hikers, joggers, and mountain bikers. The park trails connect to the Intemann trail to Manitou Springs, Colorado and the Section 16 conservation area to the south. In 2012, it was awarded the Stewardship Award by the Trails and Open Space Coalition.

== Gallery ==
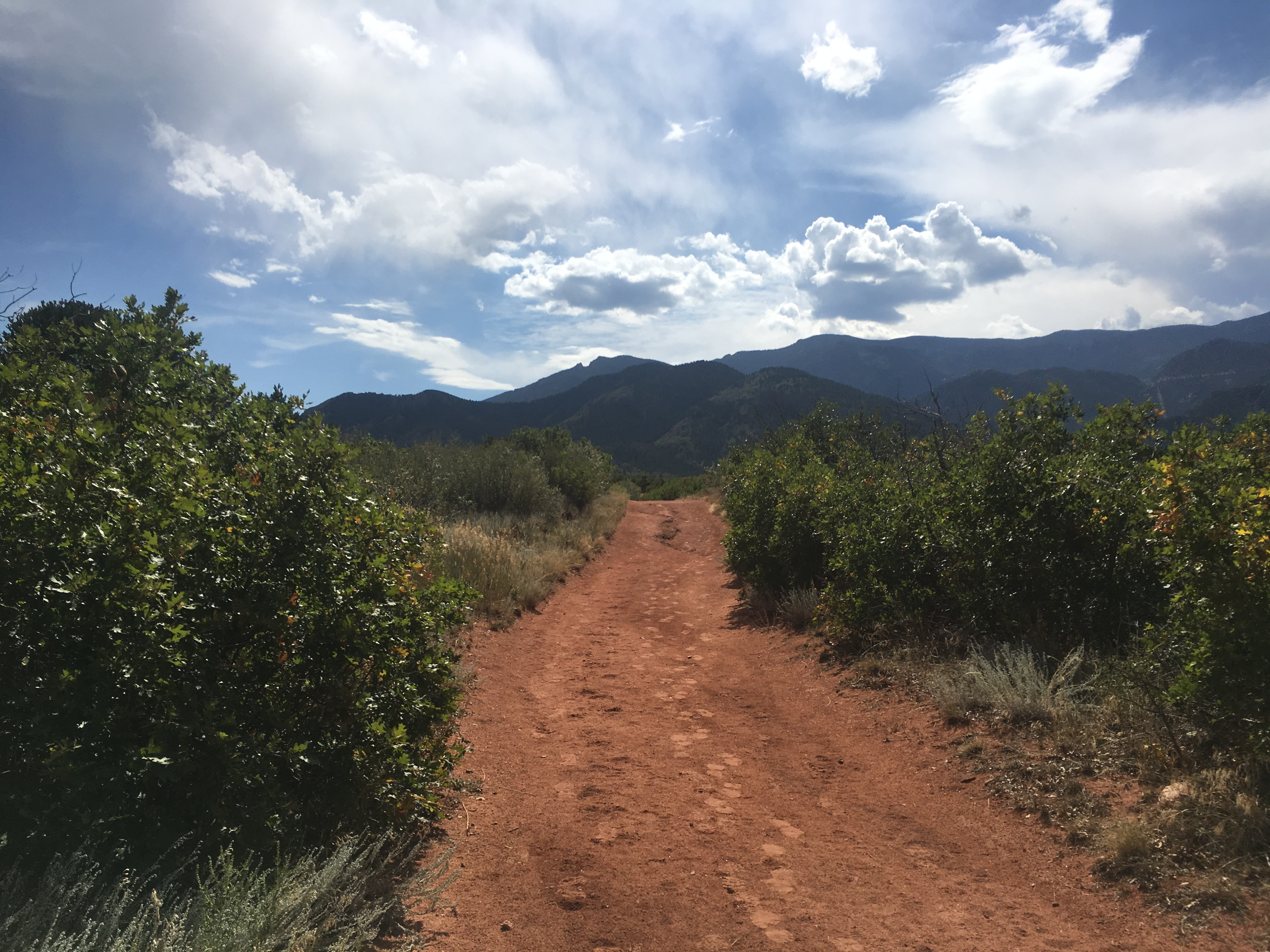
Mesa Trail, Red Rock Canyon Open Space, September 2019

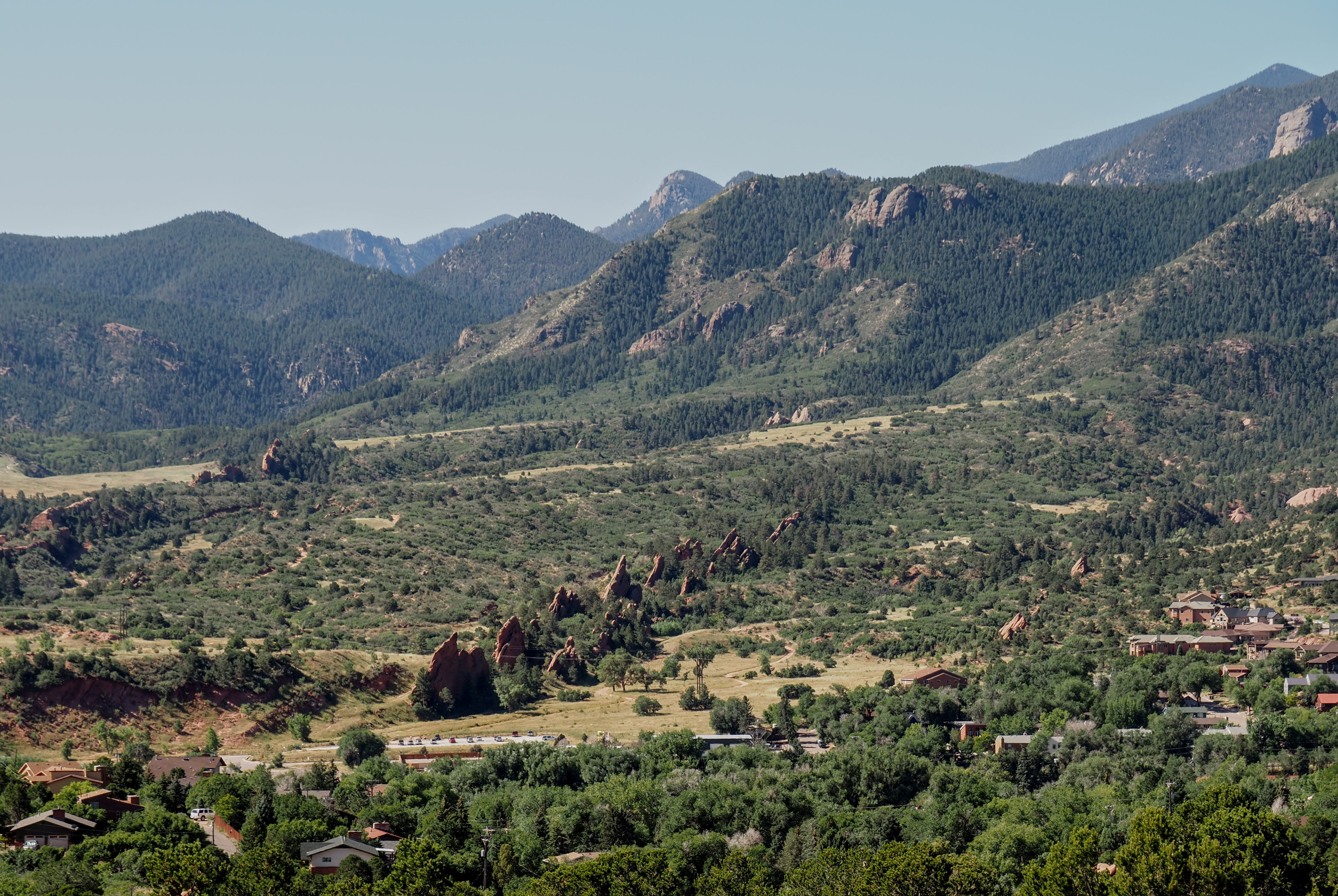
Red Rock Canyon Open Space view from Garden of the Gods

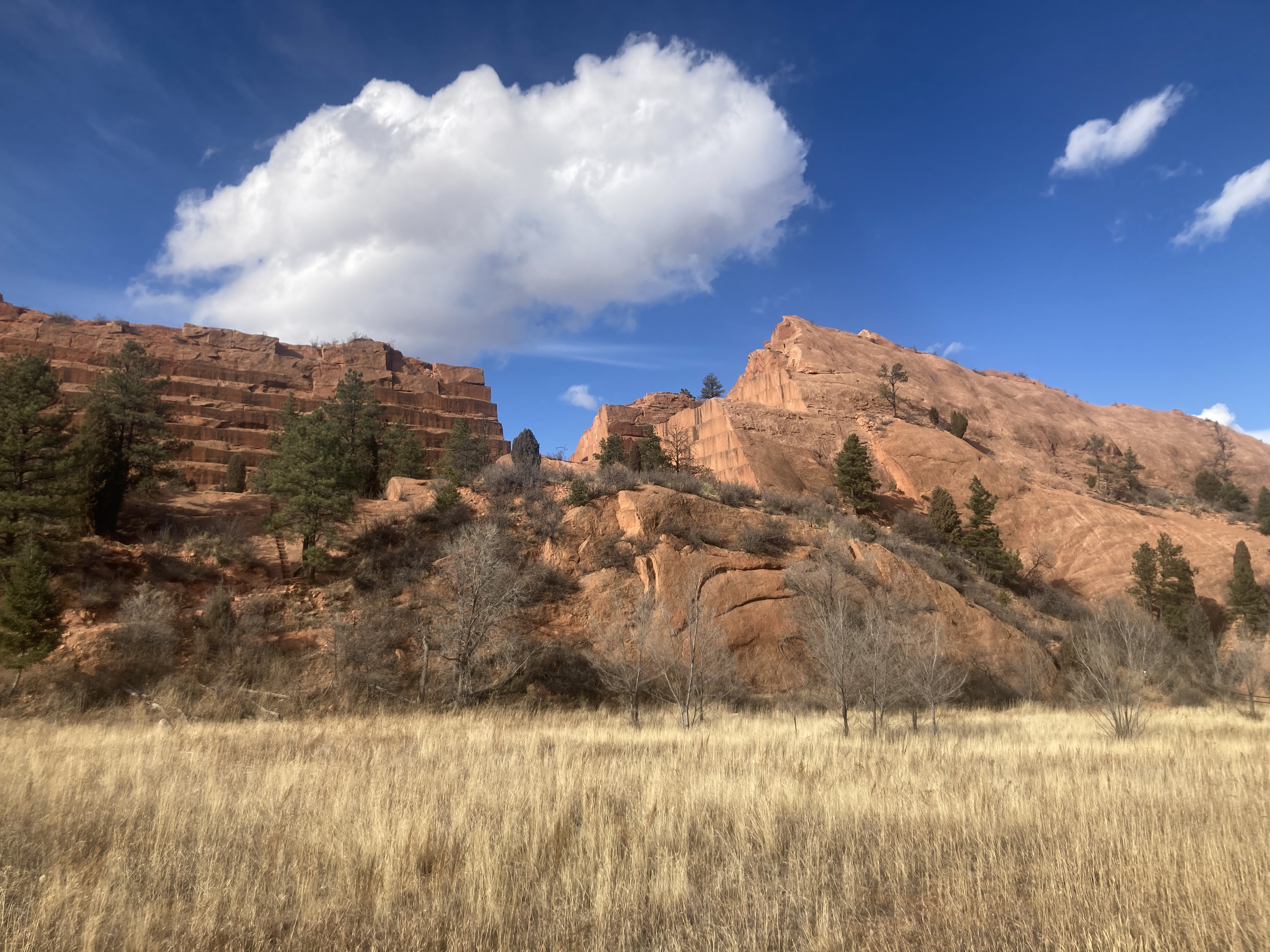
Rock formations and field in the park

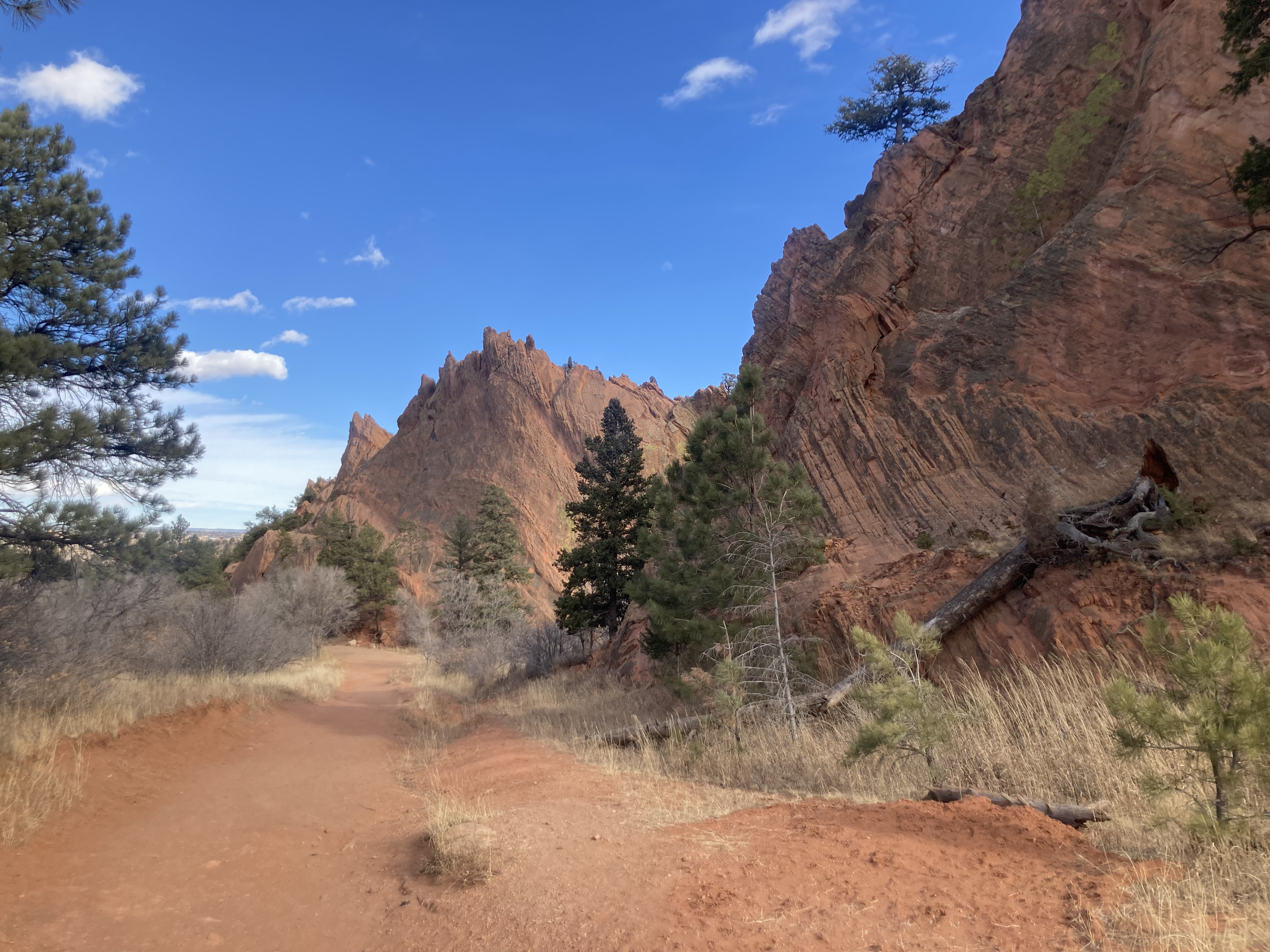
Path in the park

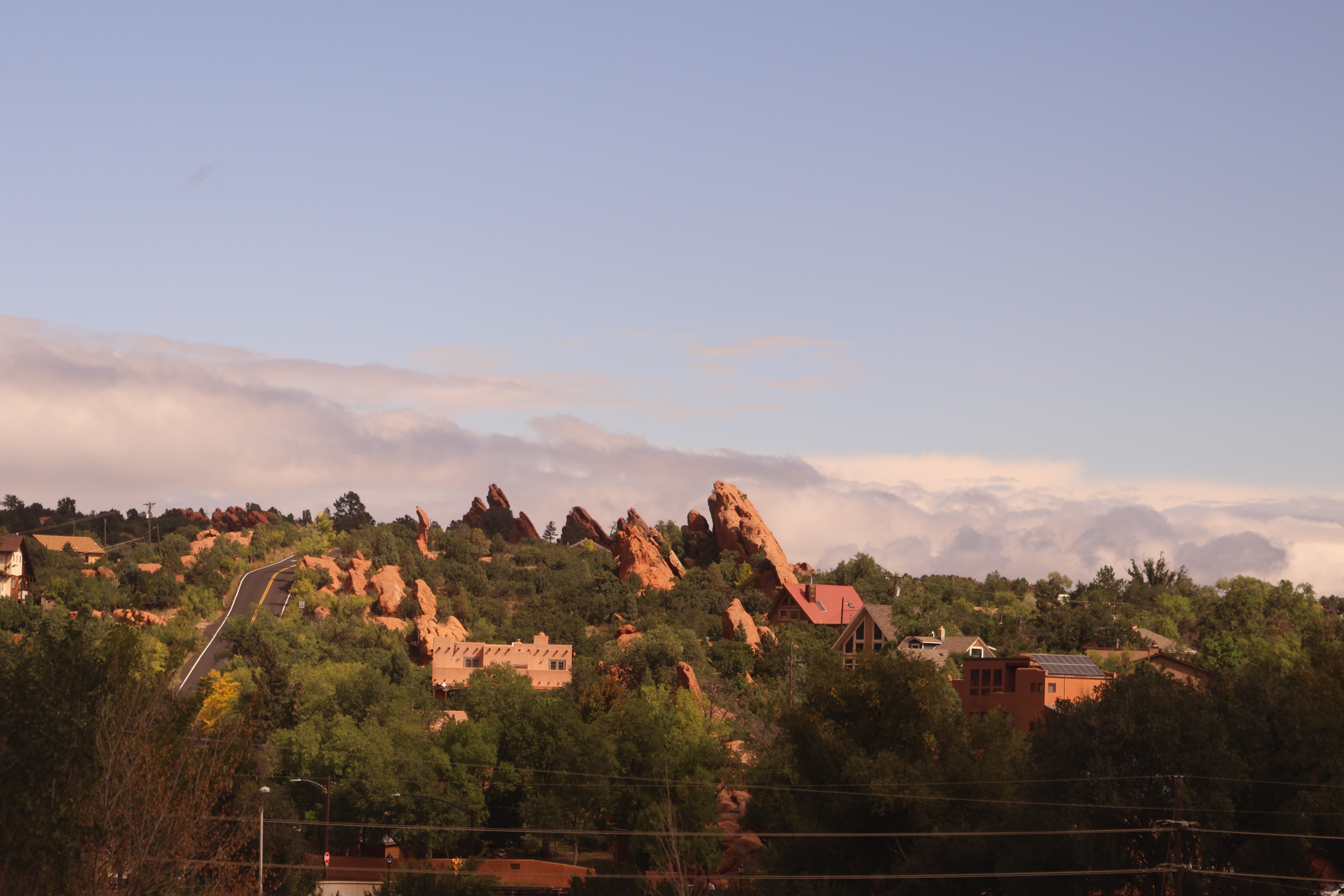
View leaving park

== See also ==
- Cheyenne Mountain
- Garden of the Gods
- Pikes Peak
