= Roxborough State Park =

State park in Colorado, United States

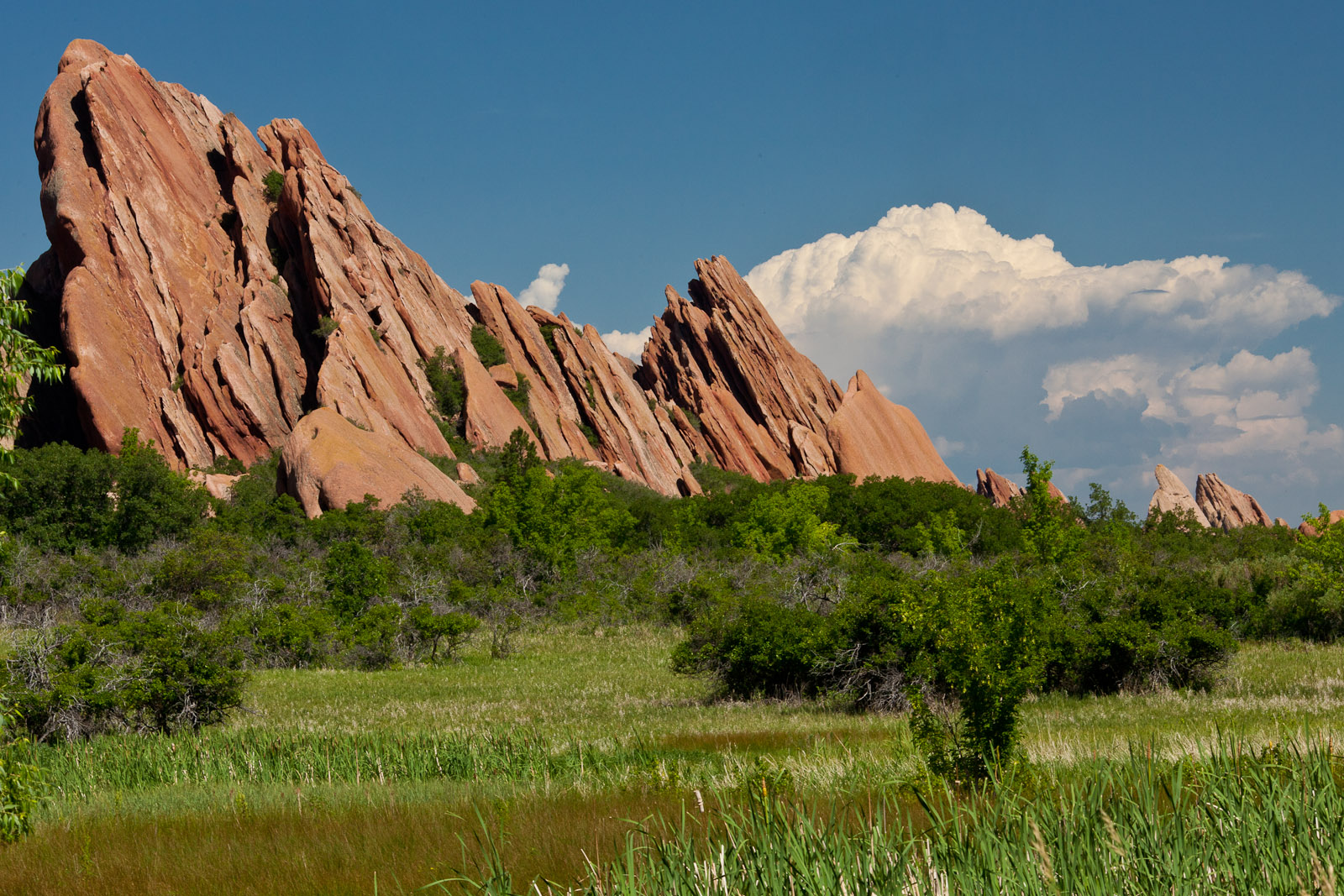
- Roxborough State Park

- Location within Colorado
- Location: Douglas County, Colorado, United States
- Nearest city: Littleton, Colorado
- Coordinates: 39°25′47″N 105°04′09″W
- Area: 3,339 acres (13.51 km^{2})
- Established: 1975
- Visitors: 215,639 (in 2021)
- Governing body: Colorado Parks and Wildlife

U.S. National Natural Landmark
- Designated: 1980

Roxborough State Park is a state park of Colorado, United States, known for dramatic red sandstone formations. Located in Douglas County 20 miles (32 km) south of Denver, Colorado, the 3,339-acre (13.51 km^{2}) park was established in 1975. In 1980 it was recognized as a National Natural Landmark.

== Geography ==
Roxborough State Park, a 3,339-acre (13.51 km^{2}) Colorado State Park, is known for dramatic red sandstone formations. It is located in Douglas County 25 miles (40 km) south of Denver, Colorado. In 1980 it was recognized as a National Natural Landmark because of the number of ecological systems and geological formations. It is also a State Historic Site and National Cultural District because of the number of archaeological sites.

=== Climate ===
According to the Köppen Climate Classification system, Roxborough State Park has an oceanic climate, abbreviated "Cfb" on climate maps. The hottest temperature recorded in Roxborough State Park was 100 °F (38 °C) on July 17, 1997, and July 21, 1997, while the coldest temperature recorded was −24 °F (−31 °C) on February 2, 2011.

Climate data for Roxborough State Park, Colorado, 1991–2020 normals, extremes 1995–present
Month	Jan	Feb	Mar	Apr	May	Jun	Jul	Aug	Sep	Oct	Nov	Dec	Year
Record high °F (°C)	75 (24)	76 (24)	78 (26)	84 (29)	93 (34)	99 (37)	100 (38)	99 (37)	96 (36)	88 (31)	79 (26)	74 (23)	100 (38)
Mean maximum °F (°C)	63.6 (17.6)	64.6 (18.1)	72.7 (22.6)	76.9 (24.9)	83.3 (28.5)	92.8 (33.8)	94.1 (34.5)	92.4 (33.6)	90.4 (32.4)	82.1 (27.8)	73.4 (23.0)	64.4 (18.0)	94.5 (34.7)
Mean daily maximum °F (°C)	45.9 (7.7)	46.2 (7.9)	53.6 (12.0)	59.2 (15.1)	68.1 (20.1)	79.0 (26.1)	85.3 (29.6)	83.4 (28.6)	76.5 (24.7)	64.6 (18.1)	53.6 (12.0)	45.7 (7.6)	63.4 (17.5)
Daily mean °F (°C)	32.6 (0.3)	32.6 (0.3)	39.8 (4.3)	45.6 (7.6)	54.6 (12.6)	64.5 (18.1)	71.8 (22.1)	70.2 (21.2)	62.4 (16.9)	50.0 (10.0)	39.8 (4.3)	31.8 (−0.1)	49.6 (9.8)
Mean daily minimum °F (°C)	19.3 (−7.1)	19.0 (−7.2)	26.0 (−3.3)	31.9 (−0.1)	41.0 (5.0)	50.0 (10.0)	58.3 (14.6)	57.0 (13.9)	48.2 (9.0)	35.5 (1.9)	25.9 (−3.4)	18.0 (−7.8)	35.8 (2.1)
Mean minimum °F (°C)	−5.5 (−20.8)	−5.4 (−20.8)	6.1 (−14.4)	14.9 (−9.5)	25.7 (−3.5)	37.2 (2.9)	48.1 (8.9)	44.9 (7.2)	33.4 (0.8)	18.4 (−7.6)	5.9 (−14.5)	−5.3 (−20.7)	−12.0 (−24.4)
Record low °F (°C)	−15 (−26)	−24 (−31)	−14 (−26)	−2 (−19)	18 (−8)	29 (−2)	37 (3)	37 (3)	20 (−7)	0 (−18)	−14 (−26)	−20 (−29)	−24 (−31)
Average precipitation inches (mm)	0.83 (21)	1.03 (26)	1.94 (49)	2.83 (72)	2.62 (67)	2.09 (53)	2.26 (57)	2.33 (59)	1.62 (41)	1.35 (34)	1.10 (28)	0.94 (24)	20.94 (531)
Average snowfall inches (cm)	11.2 (28)	21.6 (55)	16.9 (43)	19.0 (48)	1.8 (4.6)	0.0 (0.0)	0.0 (0.0)	0.0 (0.0)	0.1 (0.25)	7.5 (19)	11.6 (29)	21.2 (54)	110.9 (280.85)
Average precipitation days (≥ 0.01 in)	4.5	6.6	5.7	7.8	12.3	6.8	9.5	8.7	5.8	5.7	4.0	5.5	82.9
Average snowy days (≥ 0.1 in)	4.2	6.1	4.1	4.9	0.8	0.0	0.0	0.0	0.1	1.8	2.8	5.3	30.1
Source 1: NOAA
Source 2: National Weather Service (mean maxima and minima, precip days, average snowfall/snow days 2006–2020)

== Geology ==
Roxborough State Park is a designated Colorado Natural Area and National Natural Landmark for its 300-million-year-old red sandstone Fountain Formations that tilt at a 60-degree angle. The park includes great examples of exposed Precambrian to Late Mesozoic hogback, monolithic and spire formations from the Permian, Pennsylvanian and Cretaceous age. Carpenter Peak's exposed monzonite is from the Precambrian era.

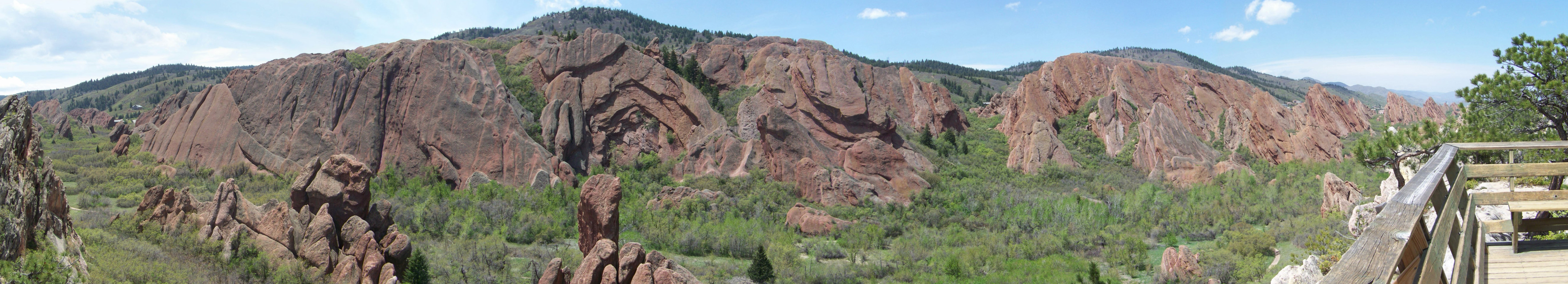
Fountain Valley as seen from Lyons Overlook, Roxborough State Park

== Flora and fauna ==
The park consists of forests of ponderosa pine and Douglas fir, prairie land, and woodlands that support many forms of wildlife. There are 145 bird, over 50 butterfly and moth, and 11 amphibian and reptile species. Mammals commonly found in the park include black bear, coyote, deer, elk, fox, mountain lion, prairie dog, and rabbit. Sources of water include Little Willow Creek, Willow Creek and Mill Gulch. Elevations range from 5,900 to 7,280 feet (1,800 to 2,220 m).

== Visitors ==
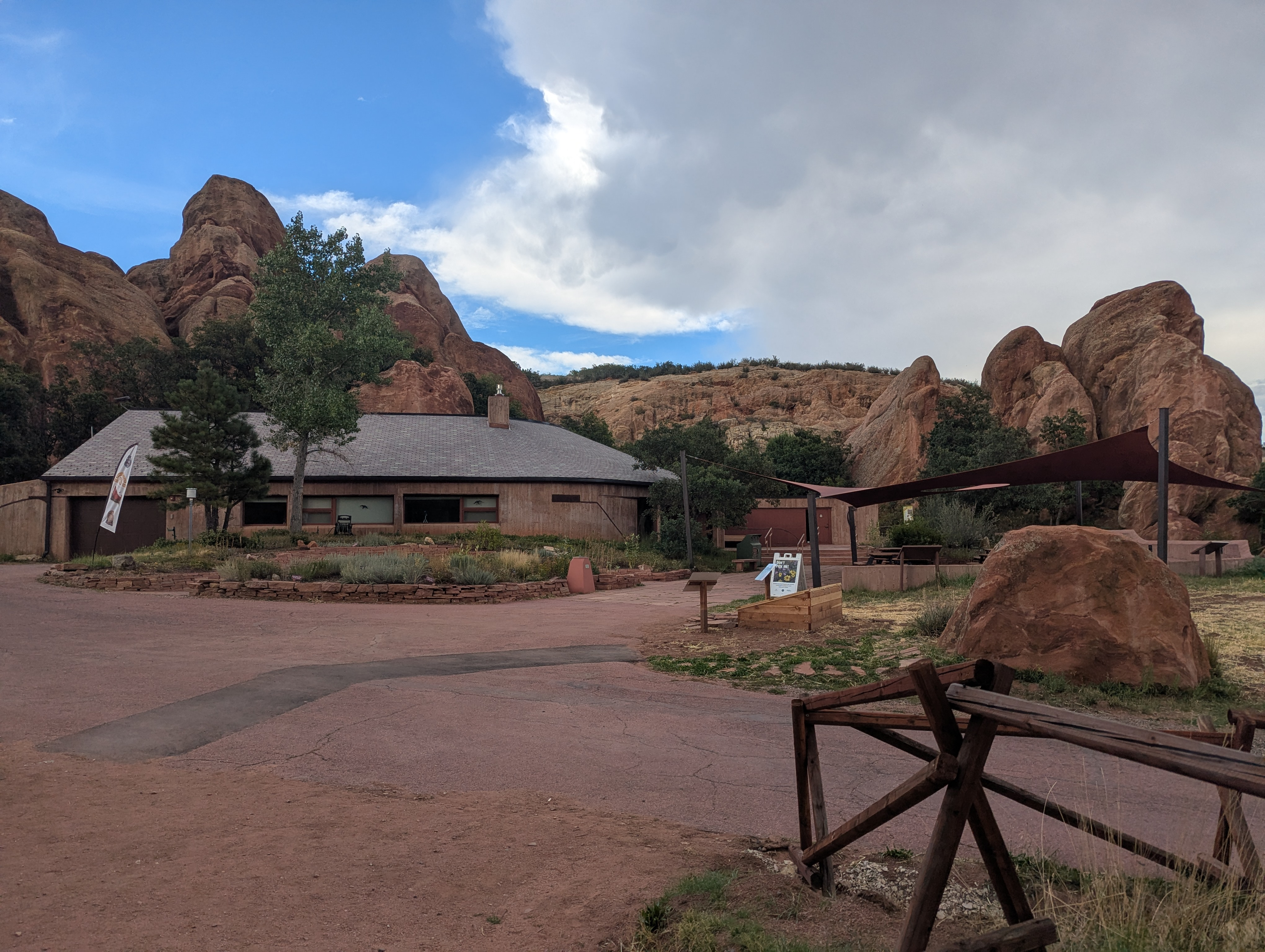
The visitors center

The park has a visitors center with exhibits, a bookstore, and restrooms.

There are six hiking trails in Roxborough State Park, a network of easy to moderate trails that also connect to Douglas County trail system, Pike National Forest and Waterton Canyon trails.

== See also ==
- Colorado State Parks
- Roxborough State Park Archaeological District
