= Larkspur, Colorado =

Town in Colorado, United States

- Home rule municipality
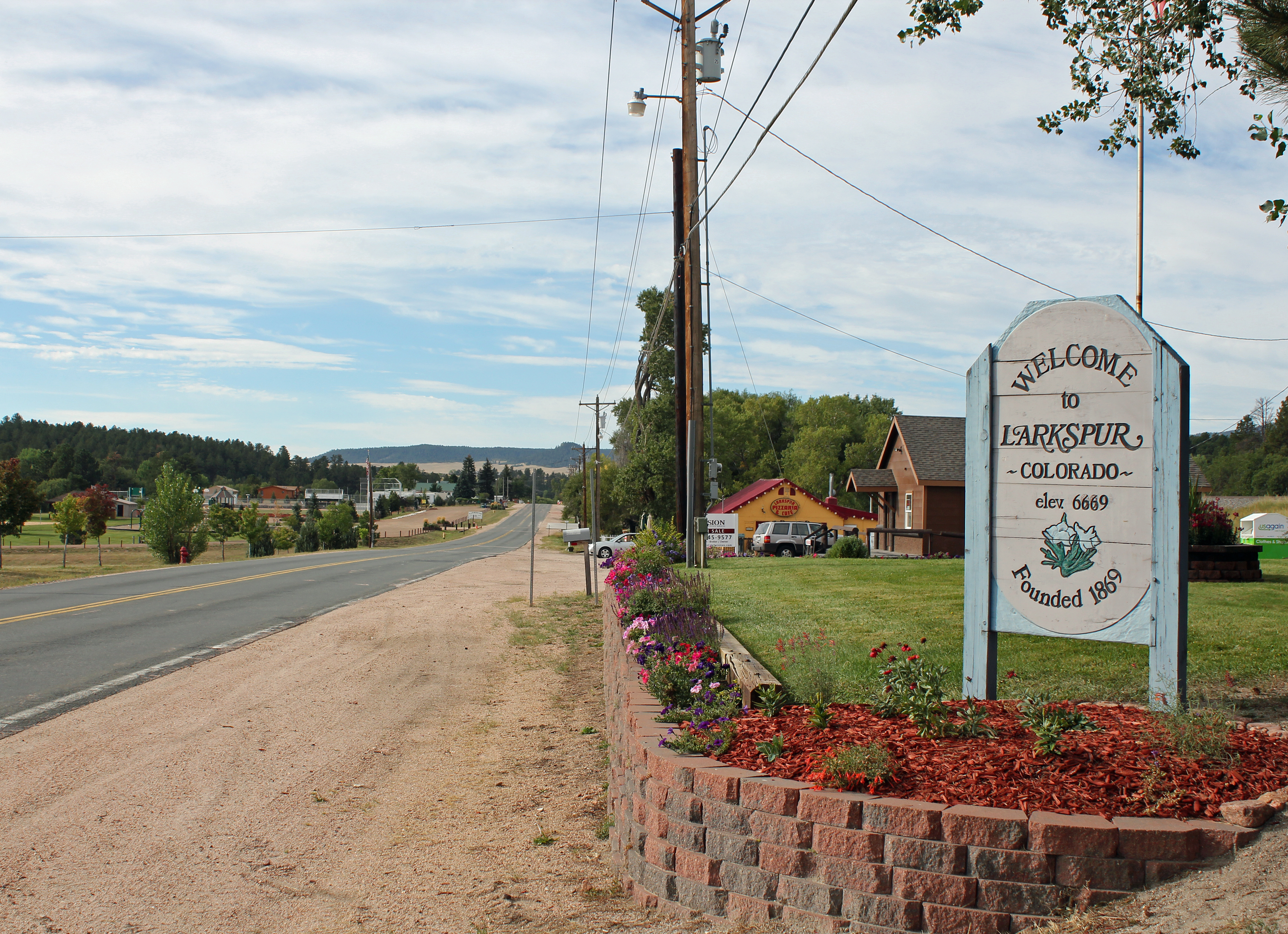
- Entering from the north

- Location of Larkspur in Douglas County, Colorado.
- Coordinates: 39°14′30″N 104°53′40″W
- Country: United States
- State: Colorado
- County: Douglas
- Incorporated: 1979

Government
  - Type: Home Rule Municipality

Area
  - Total: 1.59 sq mi (4.12 km^{2})
  - Land: 1.59 sq mi (4.12 km^{2})
  - Water: 0 sq mi (0.00 km^{2})
- Elevation: 6,880 ft (2,100 m)

Population (2020)
  - Total: 206
  - Density: 129/sq mi (50.0/km^{2})
- Time zone: UTC-7 (MST)
  - Summer (DST): UTC-6 (MDT)
- ZIP code: 80118
- Area codes: Both 303 and 720
- FIPS code: 08-43550
- GNIS feature ID: 2412878
- Website: www.townoflarkspur.org

Larkspur is a home rule municipality in Douglas County, Colorado, United States. The town population was 206 at the 2020 census. Each year, on weekends in June, July and August, the Colorado Renaissance Festival is held in the hills just west of the town. The town is served by Larkspur Elementary School, a K-6 school in the Douglas County school district.

== History ==
According to William Bright, the town was named for the plains larkspur (Delphinium geyeri).

A post office called Larkspur has been in operation since 1871. The community was named for the abundance of larkspur near the original town site.

Larkspur is also the site of the historic headquarters building of Universal Co-Masonry According to the town's website, Larkspur's Vision Statement is "Larkspur, a small friendly town in Colorado. A town that works together by: Fostering a Government of Integrity that Responds to its People, Directing Future Growth within Larkspur´s Small Town Values, Providing Community Facilities and Activities for All Ages, and Preserving the Natural Environment that is Unique to the Larkspur Area."

== Geography ==
Larkspur is located in southern Douglas County in the valley of East Plum Creek. Interstate 25 passes along the eastern edge of the town, with access from Exits 172, 173, and 174. I-25 leads north 11 miles (18 km) to Castle Rock, the Douglas County seat, and 39 miles (63 km) to Denver, as well as south 32 miles (51 km) to Colorado Springs.

According to the United States Census Bureau, the town has a total area of 1.5 square miles (3.9 km^{2}), all land.

== Demographics ==
Historical population
Census	Pop.	Note	%±
1980	141		—
1990	232		64.5%
2000	234		0.9%
2010	183		−21.8%
2020	206		12.6%
U.S. Decennial Census

== Transportation ==
The city is Served by I-25. It was once served by SH-18 (now Upper Lake Gulch Road). In addition to the highways, the Colorado Joint Line (which is served by Union Pacific and BNSF) also runs through the town with a large Santa Fe bridge at the south end of town.

== See also ==
- Front Range Urban Corridor
- North Central Colorado Urban Area
