= List of Delphinium species =

Species of Delphinium include:

- Delphinium alabamicum: Alabama larkspur
- Delphinium alpestre: Colorado larkspur
- Delphinium altissimum
- Delphinium andersonii: Anderson's larkspur
- Delphinium andesicola: Chiricahua Mountain larkspur
- Delphinium antoninum: Tracy's larkspur
- Delphinium arthriscifolium
- Delphinium bakeri: Baker's delphinium
- Delphinium barbeyi: subalpine larkspur
- Delphinium basalticum: basalt larkspur
- Delphinium bicolor: little larkspur
- Delphinium brachycentrum: northern larkspur
- Delphinium brownii
- Delphinium brunonianum
- Delphinium bulleyanum
- Delphinium caeruleum
- Delphinium californicum: California larkspur
- Delphinium calthifolium: from Sichuan, China
- Delphinium cardinale: scarlet larkspur
- Delphinium carolinianum: Carolina larkspur
- Delphinium caseyi: Casey's larkspur
- Delphinium cashmerianum
- Delphinium caucasicus
- Delphinium chamissonis: Chamisso's larkspur
- Delphinium cheilanthum
- Delphinium consolida
- Delphinium corymbosum
- Delphinium decorum: coastal larkspur
- Delphinium delavayi
- Delphinium denudatum
- Delphinium depauperatum: slim larkspur
- Delphinium dictyocarpum
- Delphinium distichum: twospike larkspur
- Delphinium duhmbergii
- Delphinium elatum: candle larkspur
- Delphinium exaltatum : tall larkspur
- Delphinium fissum
- Delphinium formosum: showy larkspur
- Delphinium geraniifolium: Clark Valley larkspur
- Delphinium geyeri: plains larkspur
- Delphinium glareosum: Olympic larkspur
- Delphinium glaucescens: smooth larkspur
- Delphinium glaucum: Sierra larkspur
- Delphinium gracile: espuelas de caballero
- Delphinium gracilentum: pine forest larkspur
- Delphinium grandiflorum: Siberian larkspur
- Delphinium gypsophilum: Pinoche Creek larkspur
- Delphinium hansenii: Eldorado larkspur
- Delphinium hesperium: foothill larkspur
- Delphinium hutchinsoniae: Monterey larkspur
- Delphinium hybridum
- Delphinium inopinum: unexpected larkspur
- Delphinium iris
- Delphinium ithaburense
- Delphinium leroyi
- Delphinium leucophaeum
- Delphinium likiangense
- Delphinium linarioides
- Delphinium lineapetalum: thinpetal larkspur
- Delphinium luteum: yellow larkspur
- Delphinium maackianum
- Delphinium macrocentron
- Delphinium madrense: Sierra Madre larkspur
- Delphinium menziesii: Menzies' larkspur
- Delphinium multiplex : Kittitas larkspur
- Delphinium muscosum
- Delphinium nelsonii
- Delphinium newtonianum: Newton's larkspur
- Delphinium novomexicanum: White Mountain larkspur
- Delphinium nudicaule: red larkspur
- Delphinium nuttallianum: twolobe larkspur
- Delphinium nuttallii: upland larkspur
- Delphinium occidentale: subalpine larkspur
- Delphinium oreganum
- Delphinium oxysepalum
- Delphinium parishii: desert larkspur
- Delphinium parryi: San Bernardino larkspur
- Delphinium patens: zigzag larkspur
- Delphinium pavonaceum
- Delphinium peregrinum: violet larkspur
- Delphinium polycladon: mountain marsh larkspur
- Delphinium przewalskii
- Delphinium purpusii: Kern County larkspur
- Delphinium pylzowii
- Delphinium ramosum: mountain larkspur
- Delphinium recurvatum: Byron larkspur
- Delphinium robustum: Wahatoya Creek larkspur
- Delphinium roylei
- Delphinium sapellonis: Sapello Canyon larkspur
- Delphinium scaposum: tall mountain larkspur
- Delphinium scopulorum: Rocky Mountain larkspur
- Delphinium semibarbatum
- Delphinium speciosum
- Delphinium stachydeum: spiked larkspur
- Delphinium sutchuense
- Delphinium sutherlandii: Sutherland's larkspur
- Delphinium tatsienense
- Delphinium treleasei: glade larkspur
- Delphinium tricorne: dwarf larkspur
- Delphinium triste
- Delphinium trolliifolium: Columbian larkspur
- Delphinium uliginosum: swamp larkspur
- Delphinium umbraculorum: umbrella larkspur
- Delphinium variegatum: royal larkspur
- Delphinium verdunense
- Delphinium vestitum
- Delphinium villosum
- Delphinium virescens
- Delphinium viridescens: Wenatchee larkspur
- Delphinium viride
- Delphinium wootonii: Organ Mountain larkspur
- Delphinium xantholeucum: yellow-white larkspur
- Delphinium yunnanense
- Delphinium zalil: zalil

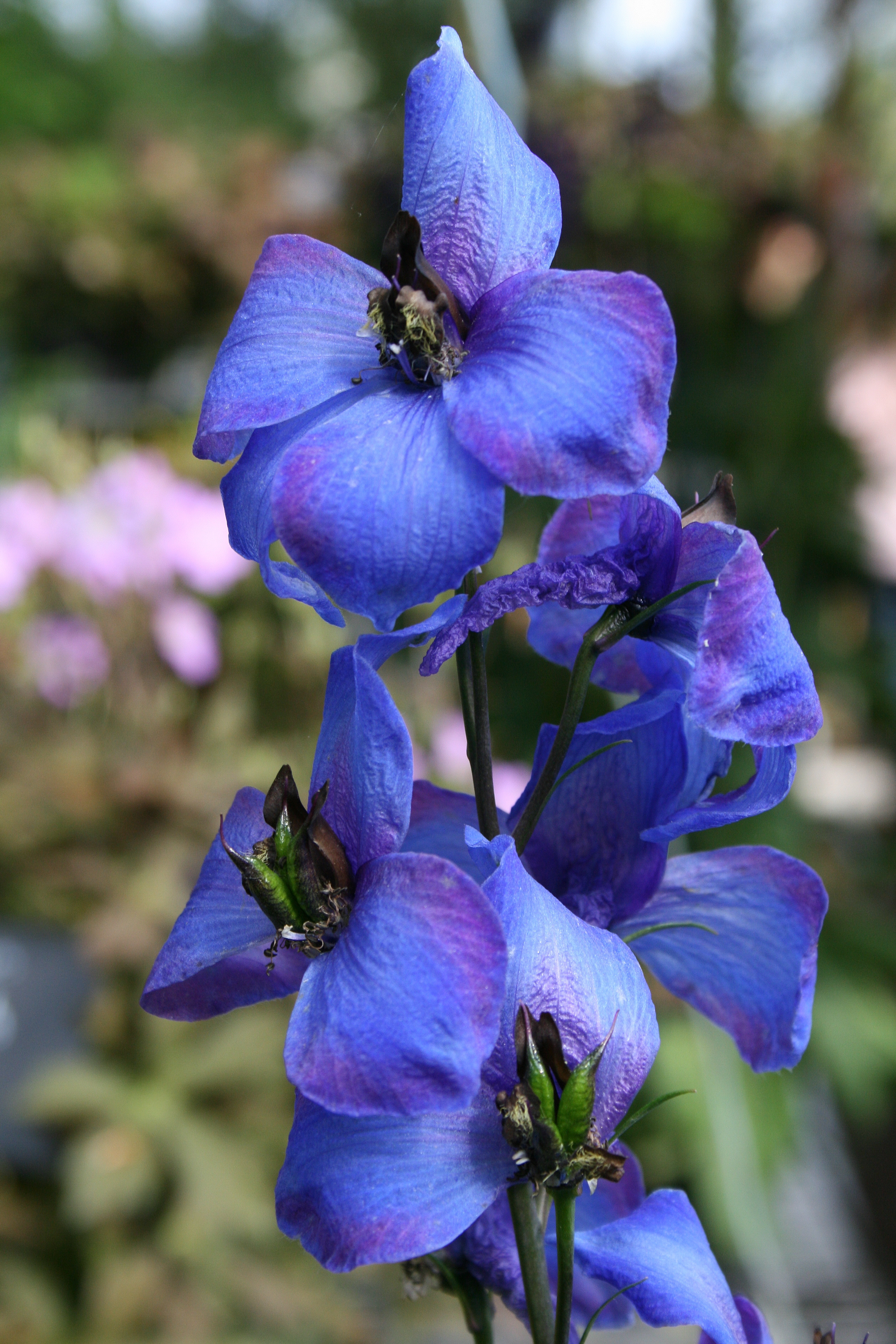
D. elatum, candle larkspur

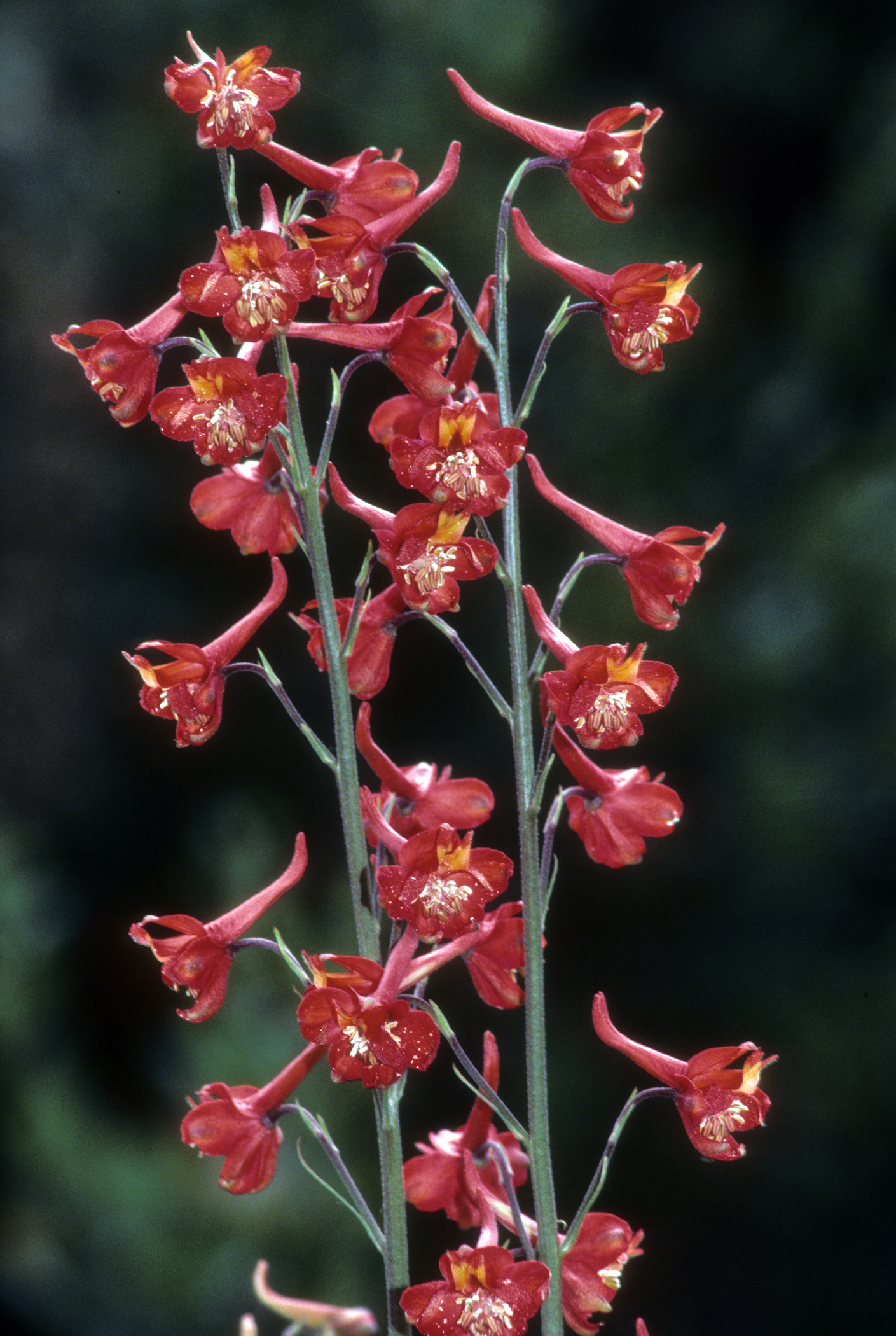
D. cardinale, scarlet larkspur

Reassigned:

- Delphinium staphisagria = Staphisagria staphisagria
