= Violdelphin =

Names
- IUPAC name 3′,4′,5,5′-Tetrahydroxy-7-(6-O-{4-[6-O-(4-hydroxybenzoyl)-β-D-glucopyranosyloxy]benzoyl}-β-D-glucopyranosyloxy)-3-[α-L-rhamnopyranosyl-(1→6)-β-D-glucopyranosyloxy]flavylium
- Systematic IUPAC name (1^{2}R,1^{3}R,1^{4}R,1^{5}R,1^{6}S,4^{2}R,4^{3}S,4^{4}S,4^{5}R,4^{6}S,8^{2}S,8^{3}R,8^{4}S,8^{5}S,8^{6}R,14^{2}S,14^{3}R,14^{4}S,14^{5}S,14^{6}R)-1^{3},1^{4},1^{5},4^{3},4^{4},4^{5},6^{5},8^{3},8^{4},8^{5},14^{3},14^{4},14^{5},18^{4}-Tetradecahydroxy-1^{6}-methyl-11,17-dioxo-6^{2}-(3,4,5-trihydroxyphenyl)-2,5,7,10,13,16-hexaoxa-6^{1}λ^{4}-6(3,7)-[1]benzopyrana-1(2),4,8,14(2,6)-tetrakis(oxana)-12(1,4),18(1)-dibenzenaoctadecaphan-6^{1}-ylium
- Other names Delphinidin 3-rutinoside-7-O-(6-O-(4-(6-O-(4-hydroxybenzoyl)-beta-D-glucosyl)oxybenzoyl)-beta-D-glucoside)

Identifiers
CAS Number	126417-59-2
3D model (JSmol)	Interactive image
ChemSpider	2340380
PubChem CID	3083066
CompTox Dashboard (EPA)	DTXSID80155183
- InChI: InChI=1S/C53H58O30/c1-18-34(58)39(63)43(67)50(76-18)75-17-33-38(62)42(66)46(70)53(83-33)80-30-14-25-26(55)12-24(13-29(25)79-47(30)21-10-27(56)35(59)28(57)11-21)78-52-45(69)41(65)37(61)32(82-52)16-74-49(72)20-4-8-23(9-5-20)77-51-44(68)40(64)36(60)31(81-51)15-73-48(71)19-2-6-22(54)7-3-19/h2-14,18,31-34,36-46,50-53,58,60-70H,15-17H2,1H3,(H4-,54,55,56,57,59,71)/p+1/t18-,31+,32+,33+,34-,36+,37+,38+,39+,40-,41-,42-,43+,44+,45+,46+,50+,51+,52+,53+/m0/s1 Key: YODABPUZPVYDEF-CIBWSIAMSA-O
- SMILES: CC1C(C(C(C(O1)OCC2C(C(C(C(O2)OC3=C([O+]=C4C=C(C=C(C4=C3)O)OC5C(C(C(C(O5)COC(=O)C6=CC=C(C=C6)OC7C(C(C(C(O7)COC(=O)C8=CC=C(C=C8)O)O)O)O)O)O)O)C9=CC(=C(C(=C9)O)O)O)O)O)O)O)O)O

Properties
Chemical formula	C_{53}H_{59}O_{30}+
Molar mass	1176.02 g/mol
- Except where otherwise noted, data are given for materials in their standard state (at 25 °C [77 °F], 100 kPa). Infobox references

Violdelphin is an anthocyanin, a plant pigment, has been found in the purplish blue flower of Aconitum chinense, in the blue flowers in the genus Campanula and in the blue flowers of Delphinium hybridum. It is a flavenoid natural product, incorporating two p-hydroxy benzoic acid residues, one rutinoside and two glucosides associated with a delphinidin.
