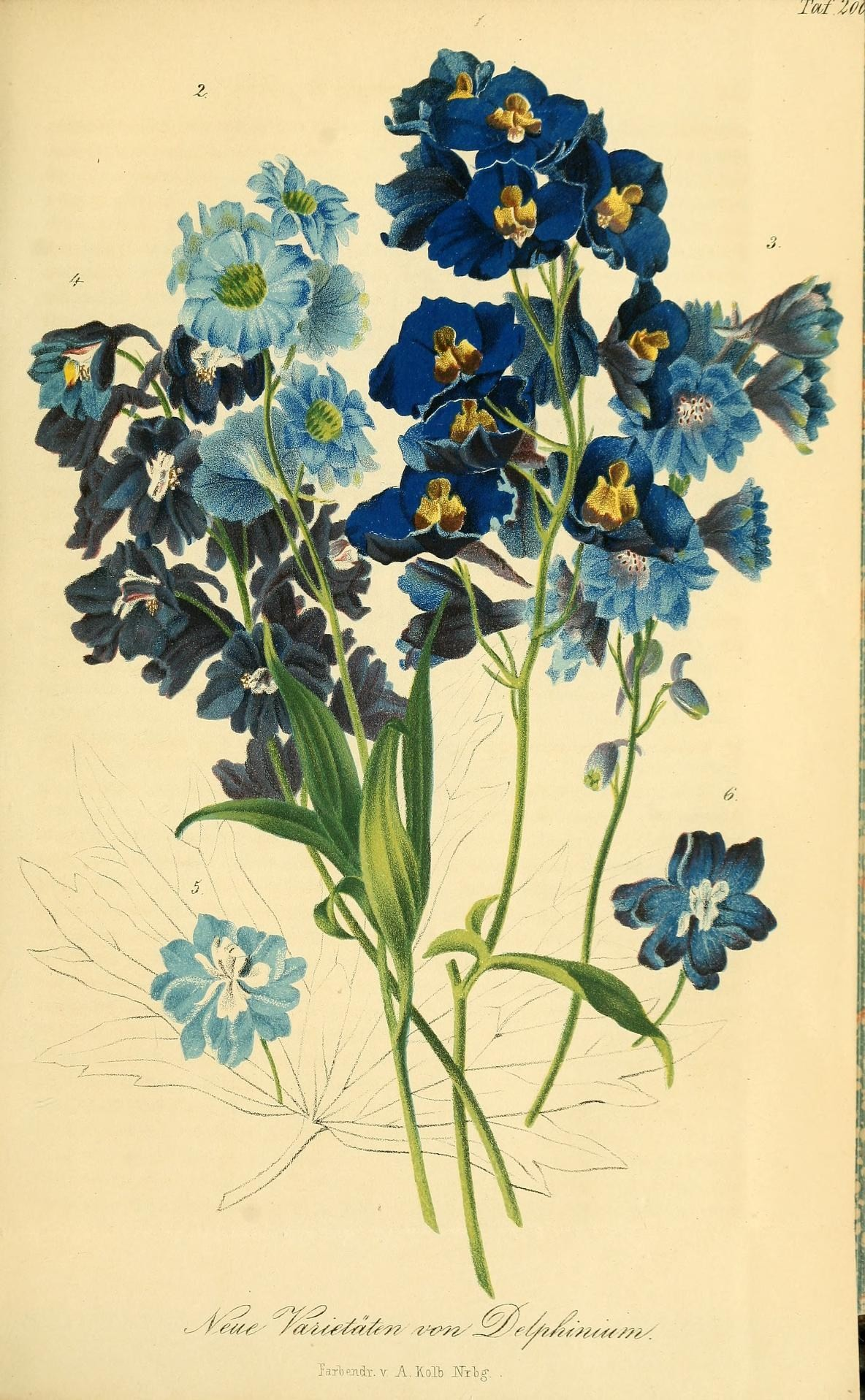

Scientific classification
- Kingdom: Plantae
- Clade: Tracheophytes
- Clade: Angiosperms
- Clade: Eudicots
- Order: Ranunculales
- Family: Ranunculaceae
- Genus: Delphinium
- Species: D. × cultorum

Binomial name
- Delphinium × cultorum Voss

= Garden delphiniums =

Species of flowering plant

Garden delphiniums are horticultural hybrids derived from some perennial species in the genus Delphinium. Breeding of garden delphiniums started from the 19th century in Western Europe. In the 20th century, the United States, Japan and New Zealand also contributed to delphinium breeding.

== Cultivar groups ==
There are mainly two cultivar groups of garden delphinium:

- Elatum Group is the most popular group. The cultivars in the group are tetraploid hybrids derived mainly from Delphinium elatum. Other species like D. cardinale are also involved.
- Belladonna Group, also known as Delphinium × belladonna, contains mostly hexaploid hybrids between D. grandiflorum and D. elatum or Elatum Group.

Some Delphinium cultivars belong to neither group, such as D. grandiflorum cultivars which don't involve interspecific hybridization and D. × ruysii 'Pink Sensation' which is a hybrid between Elatum Group and D. nudicaule.

== Gallery ==
=== Elatum Group ===
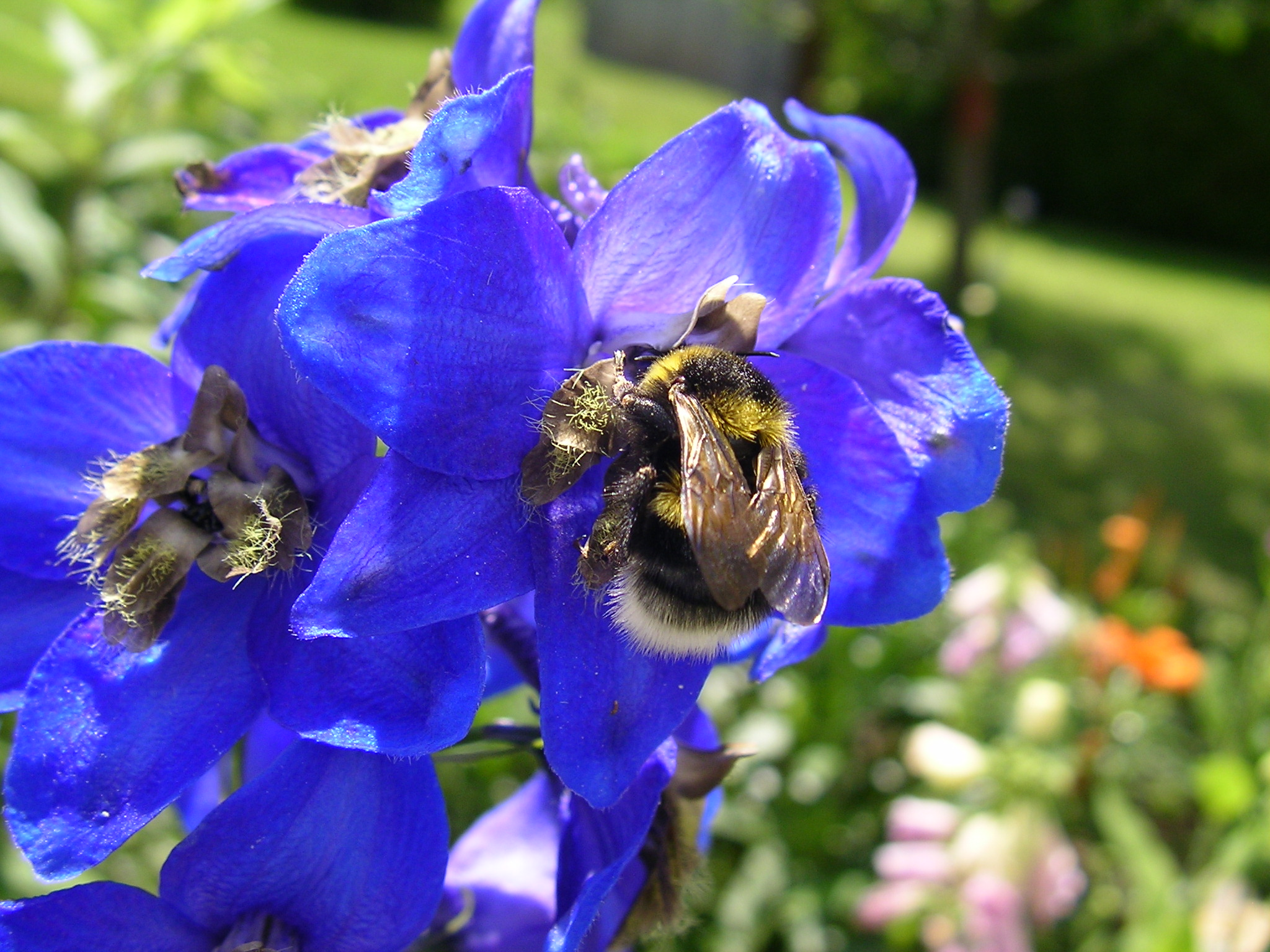
single flowers with a bumblebee

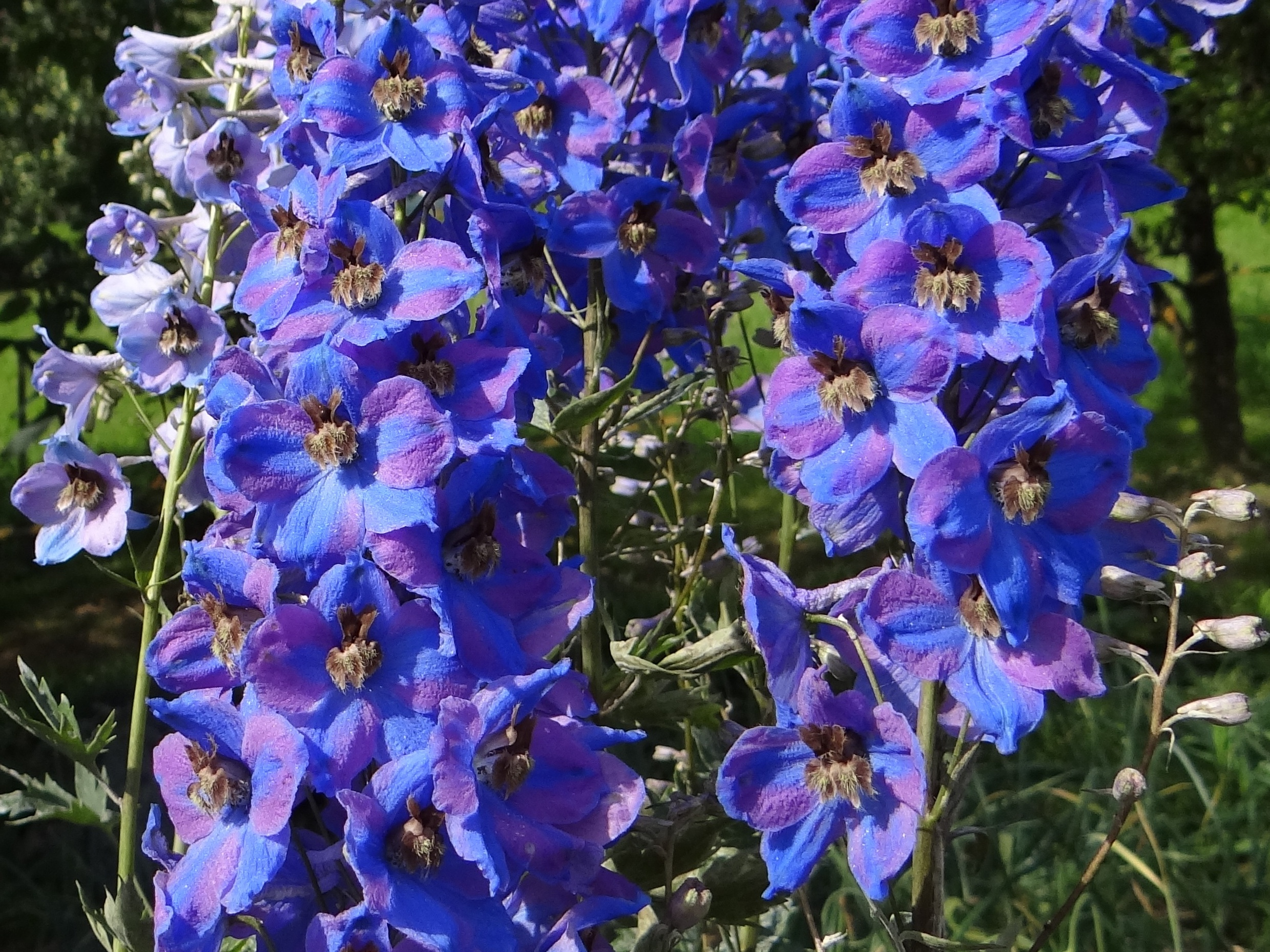
single

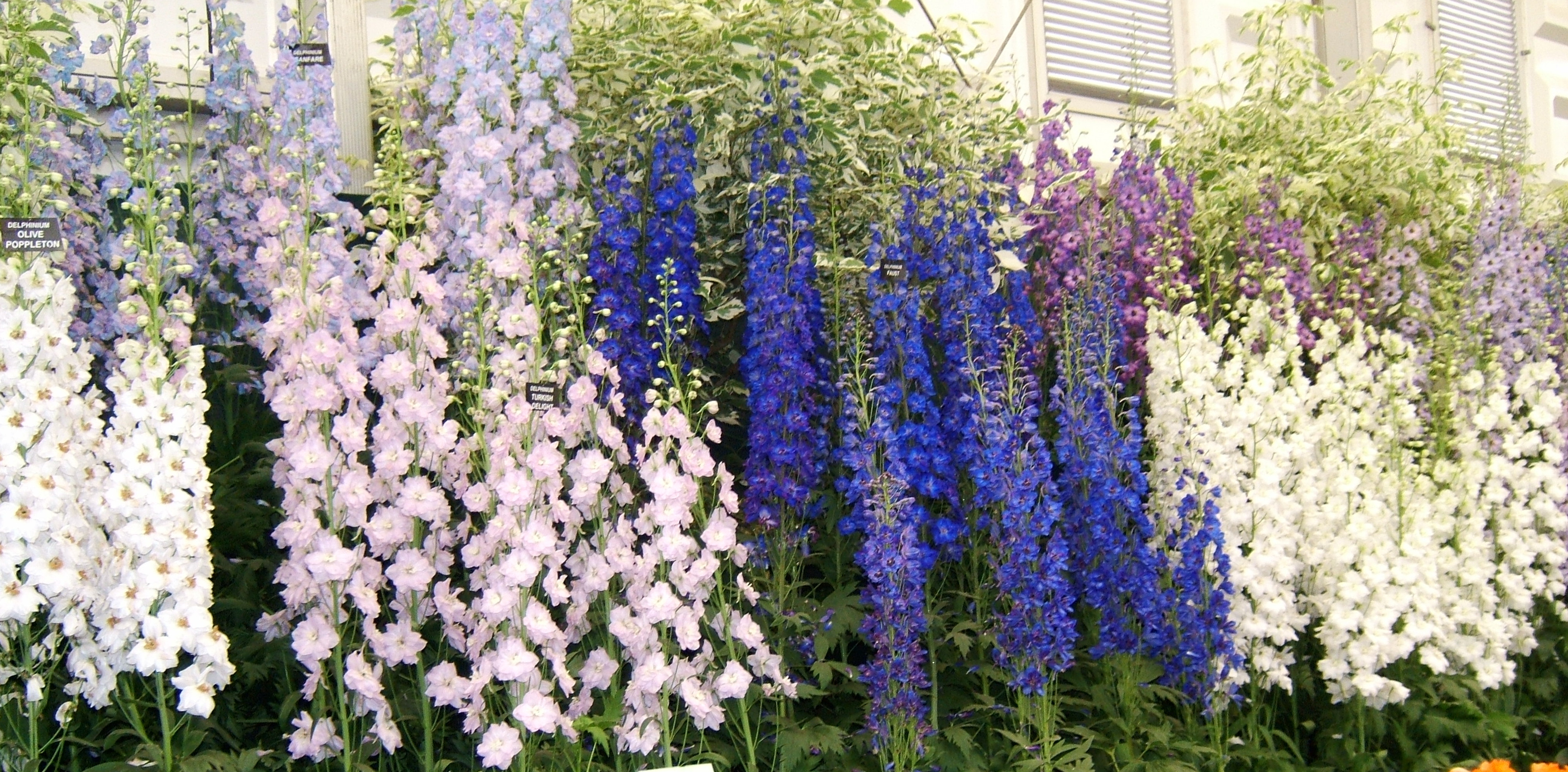
semi-double

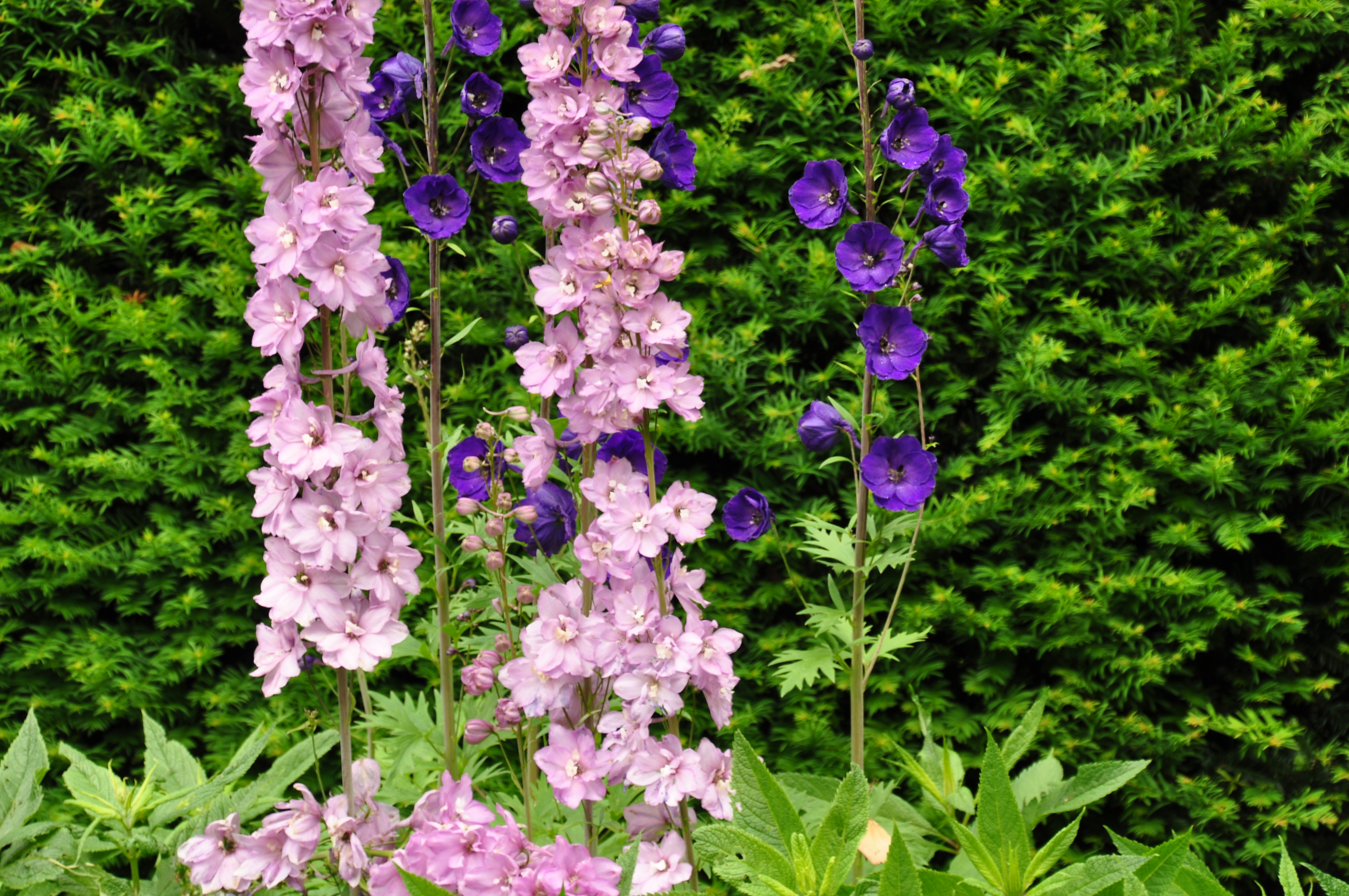
semi-double

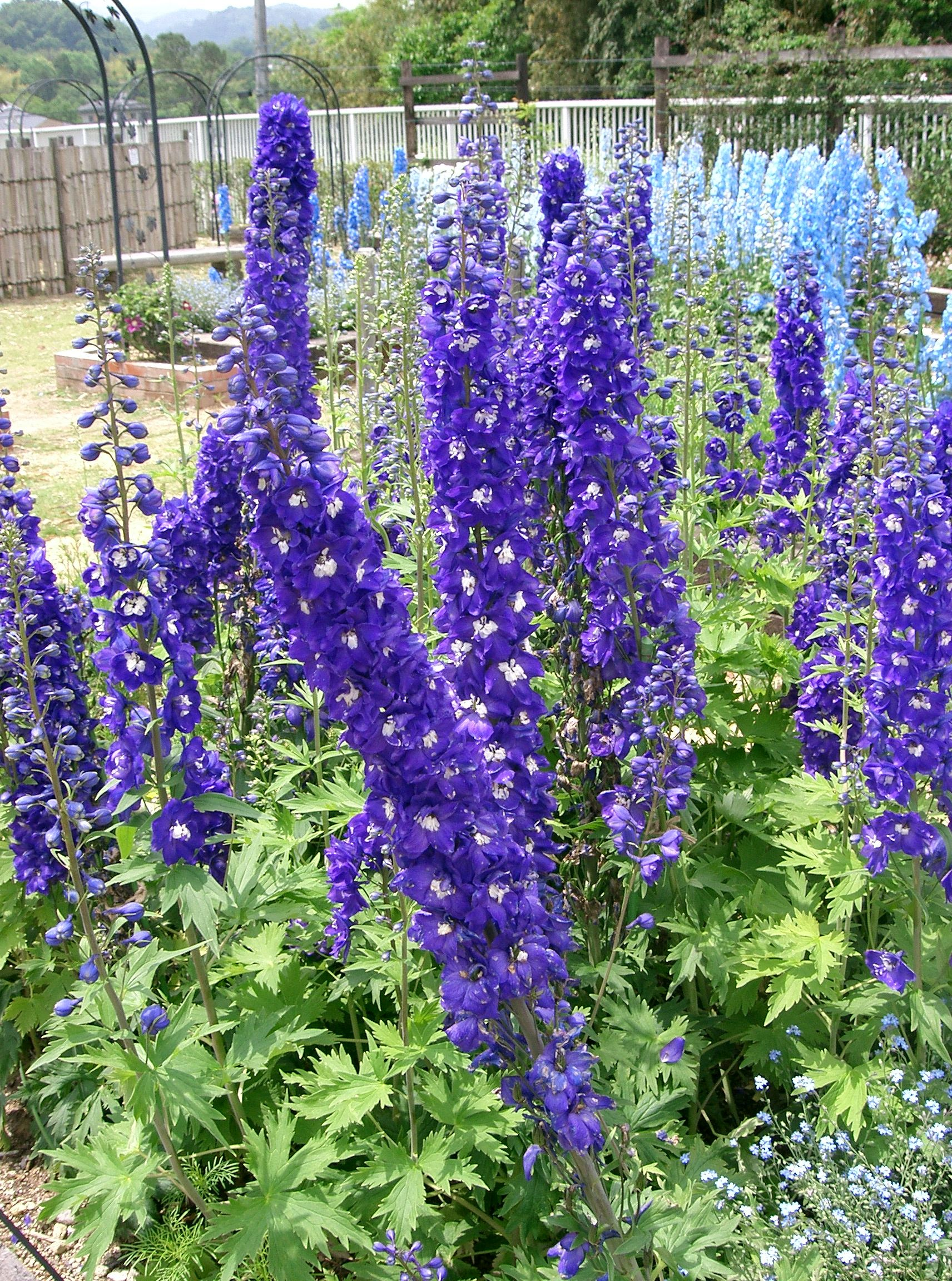
semi-double

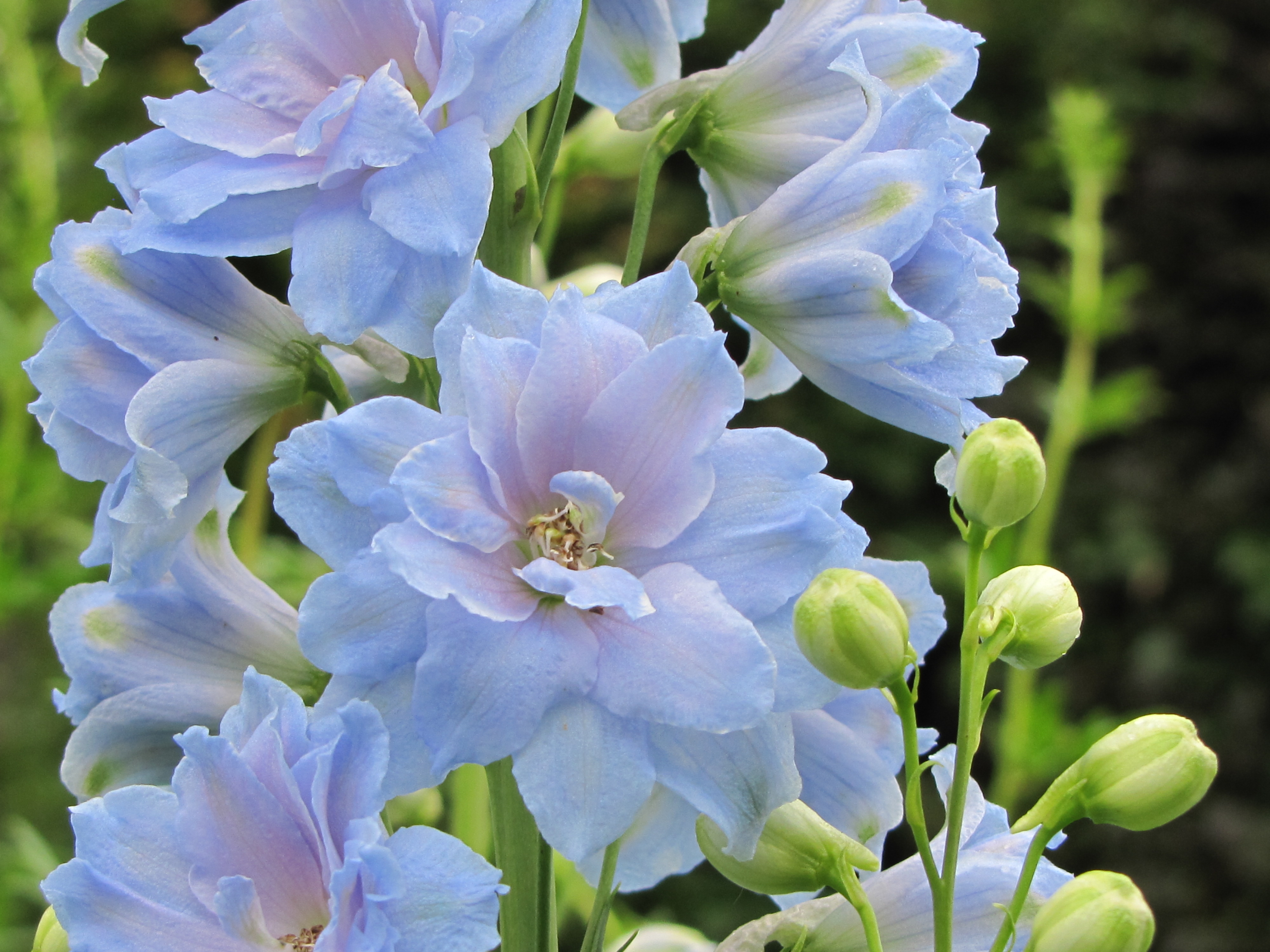
double

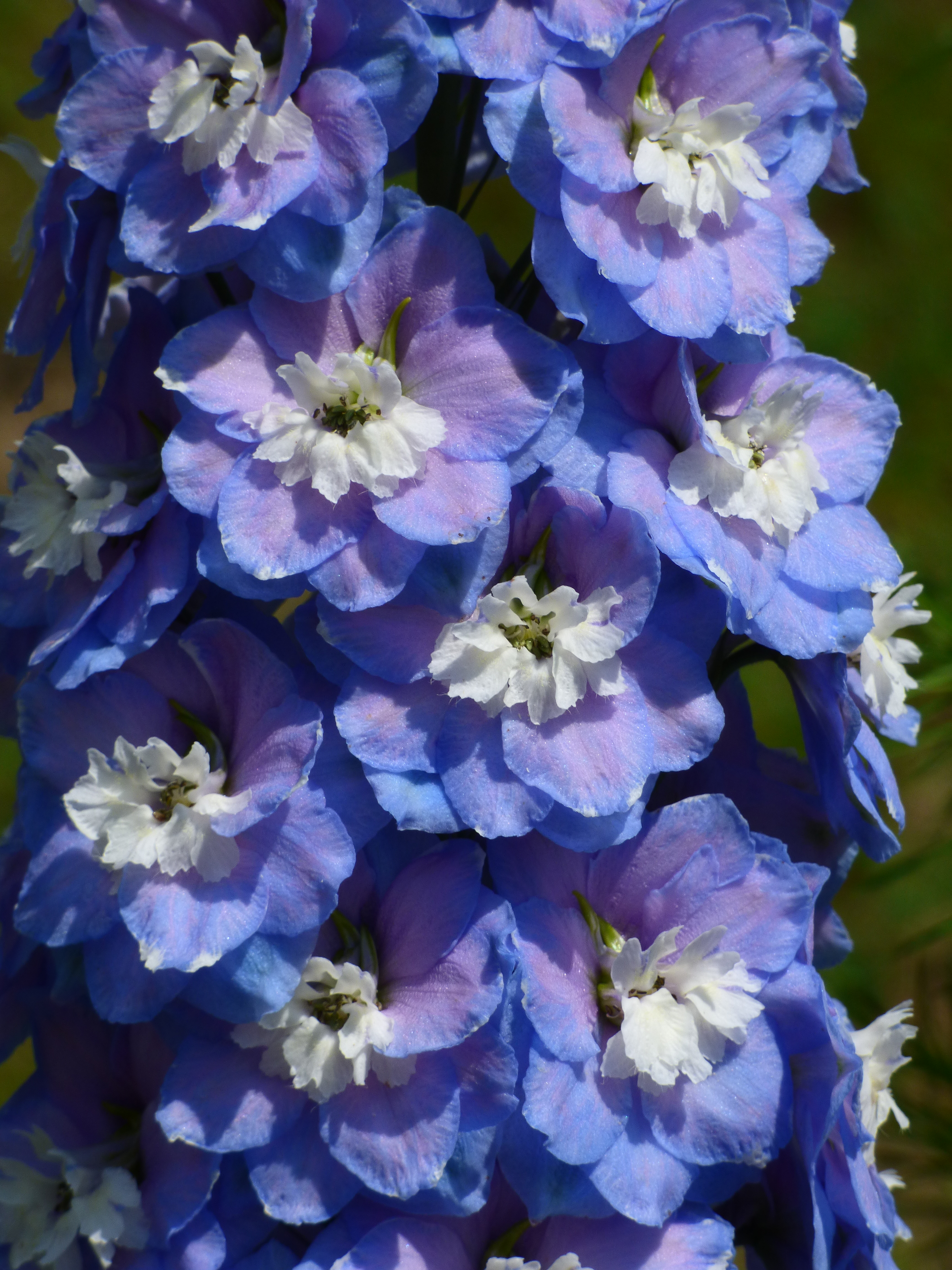
semi-double

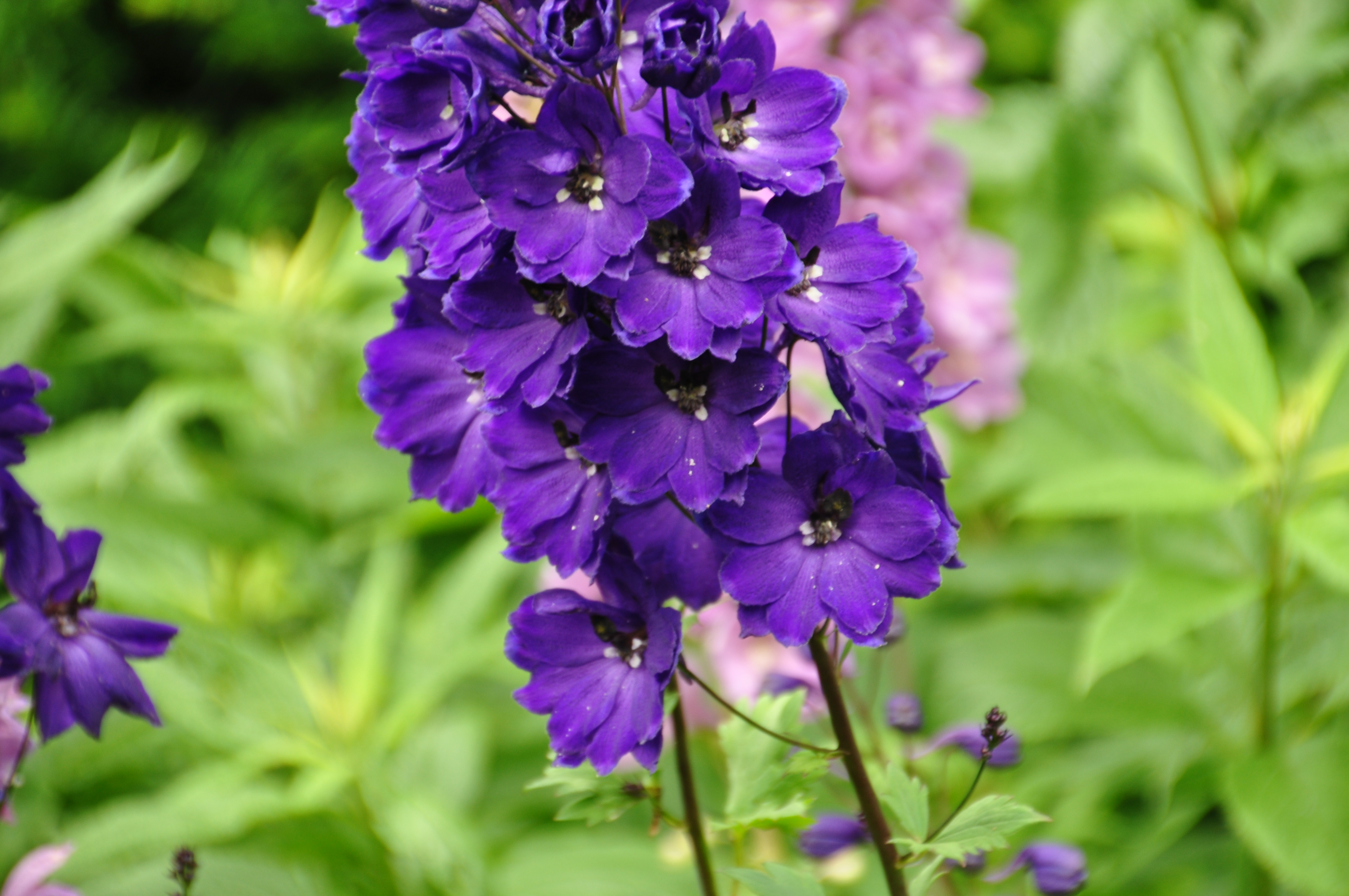
semi-double

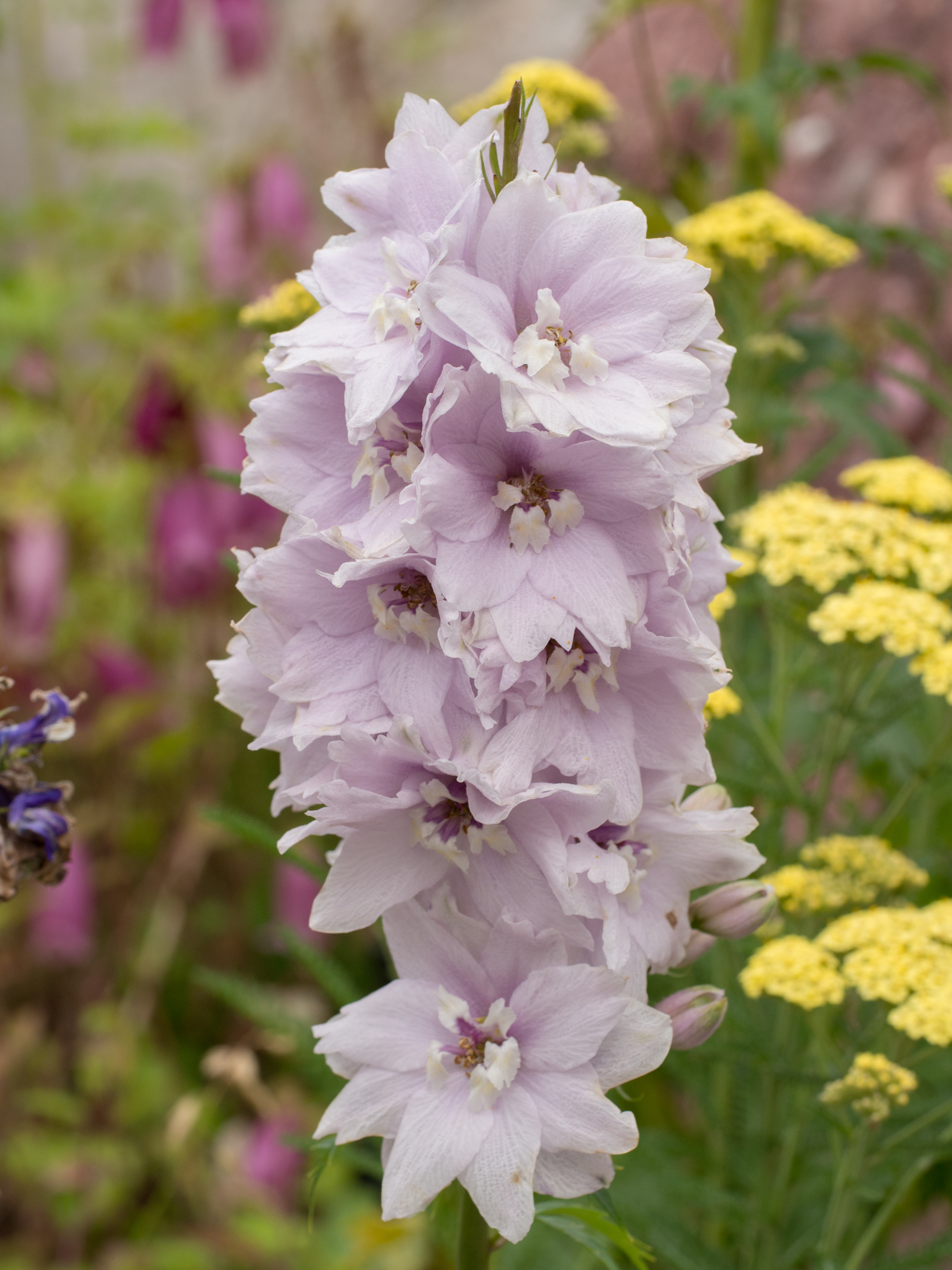
semi-double

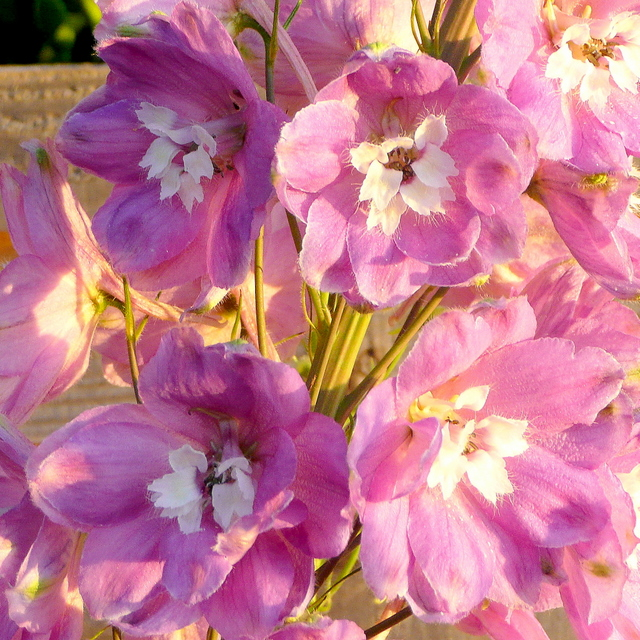
semi-double

=== Belladonna Group ===
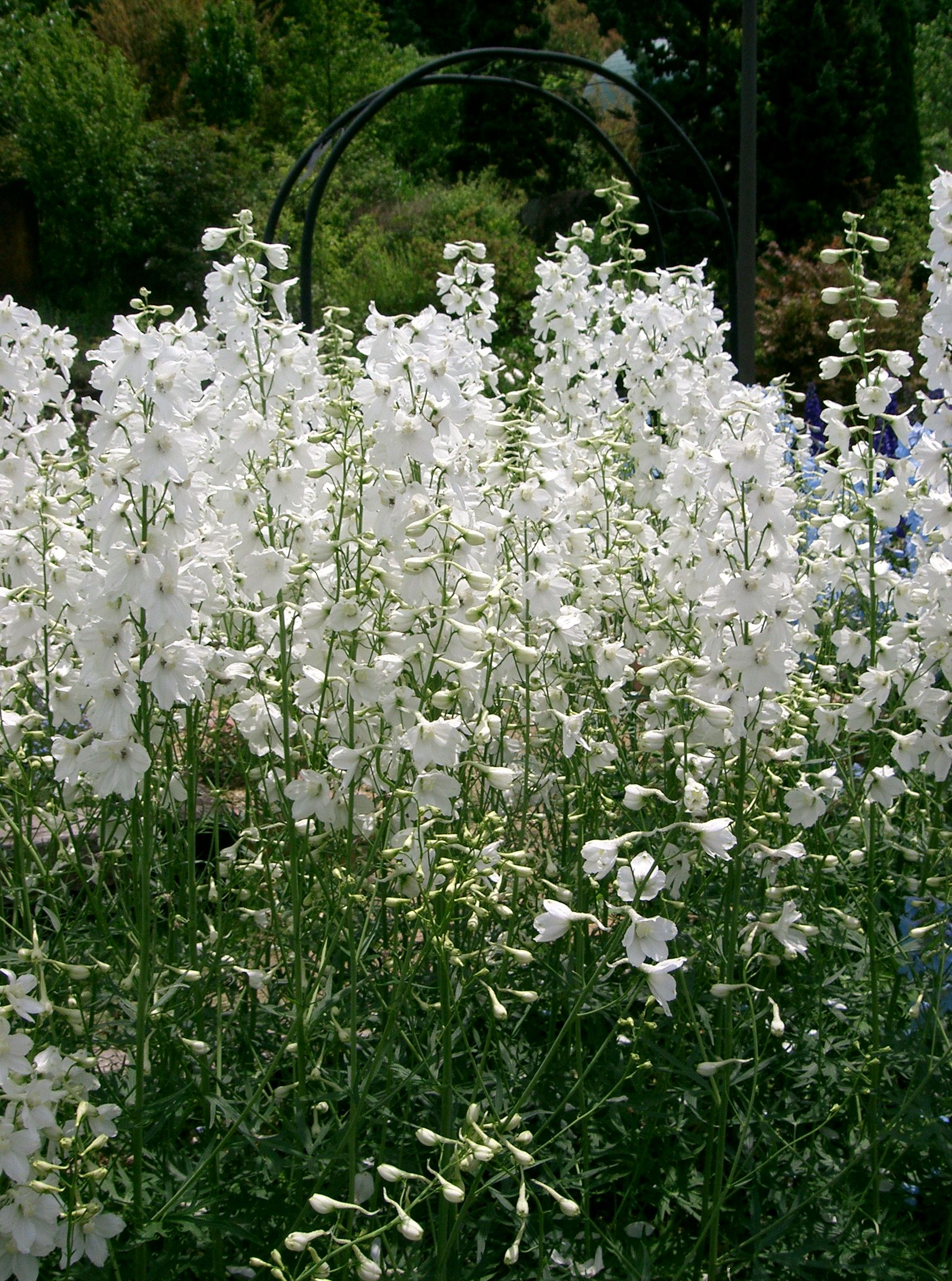

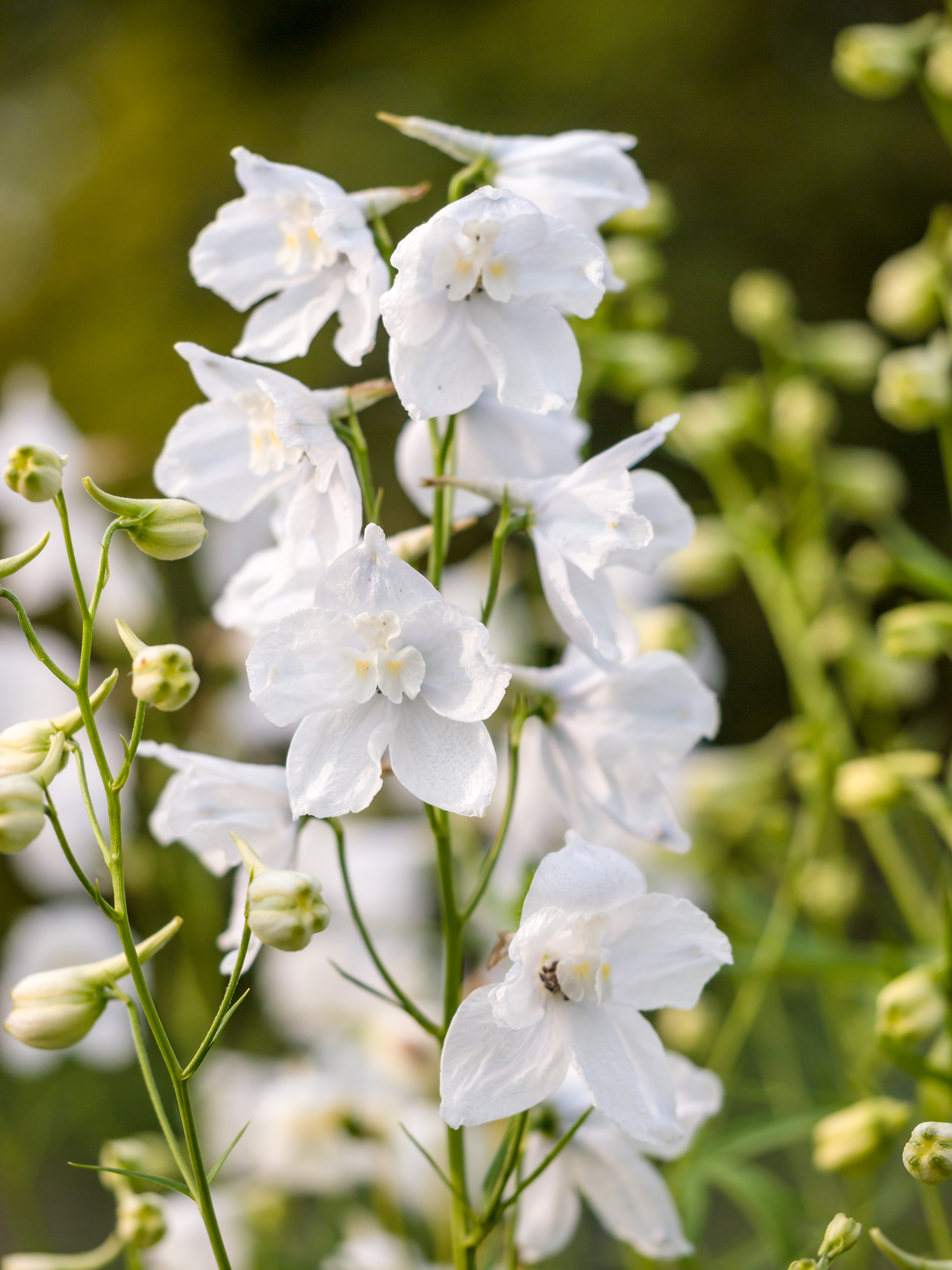

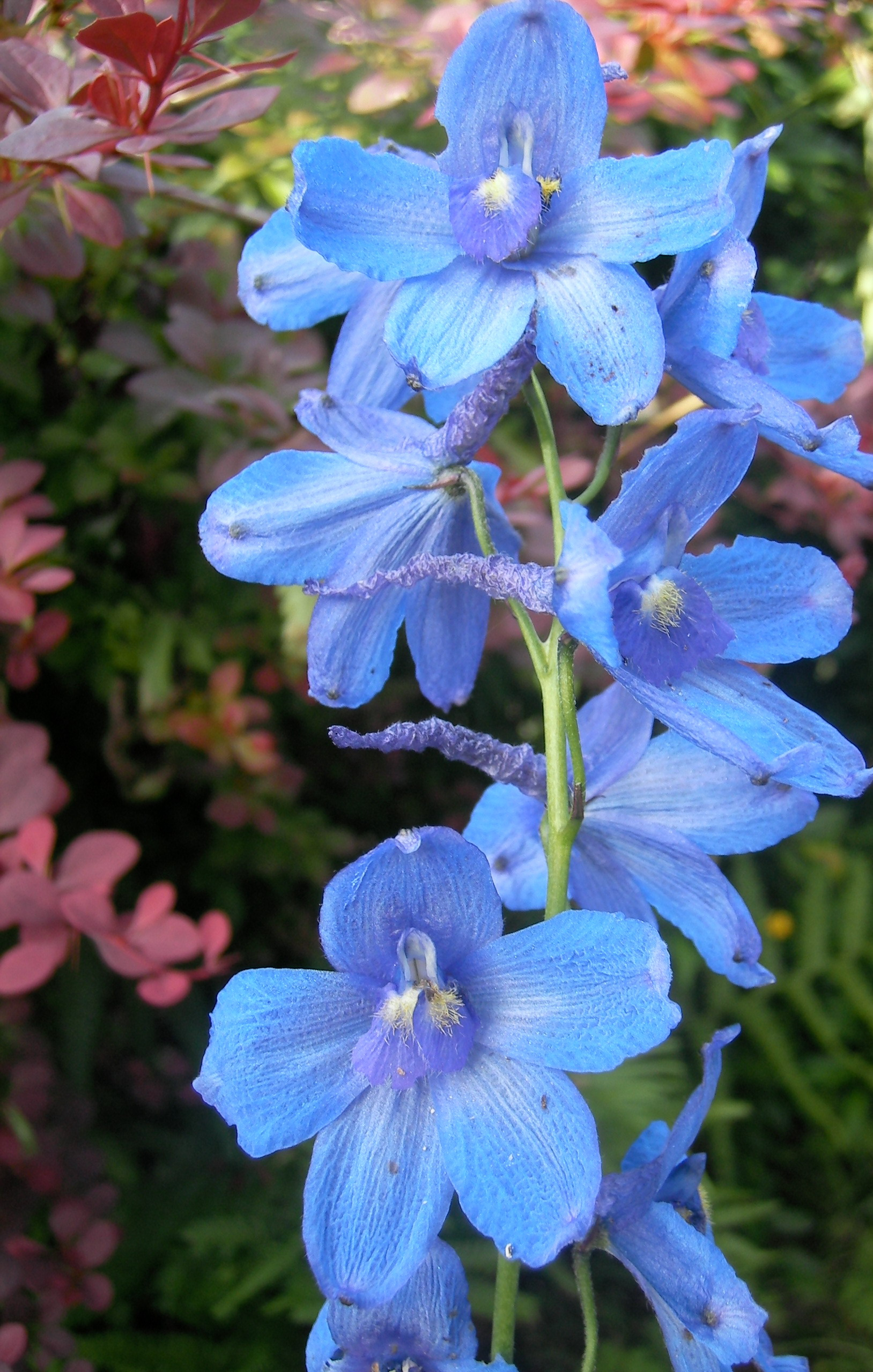

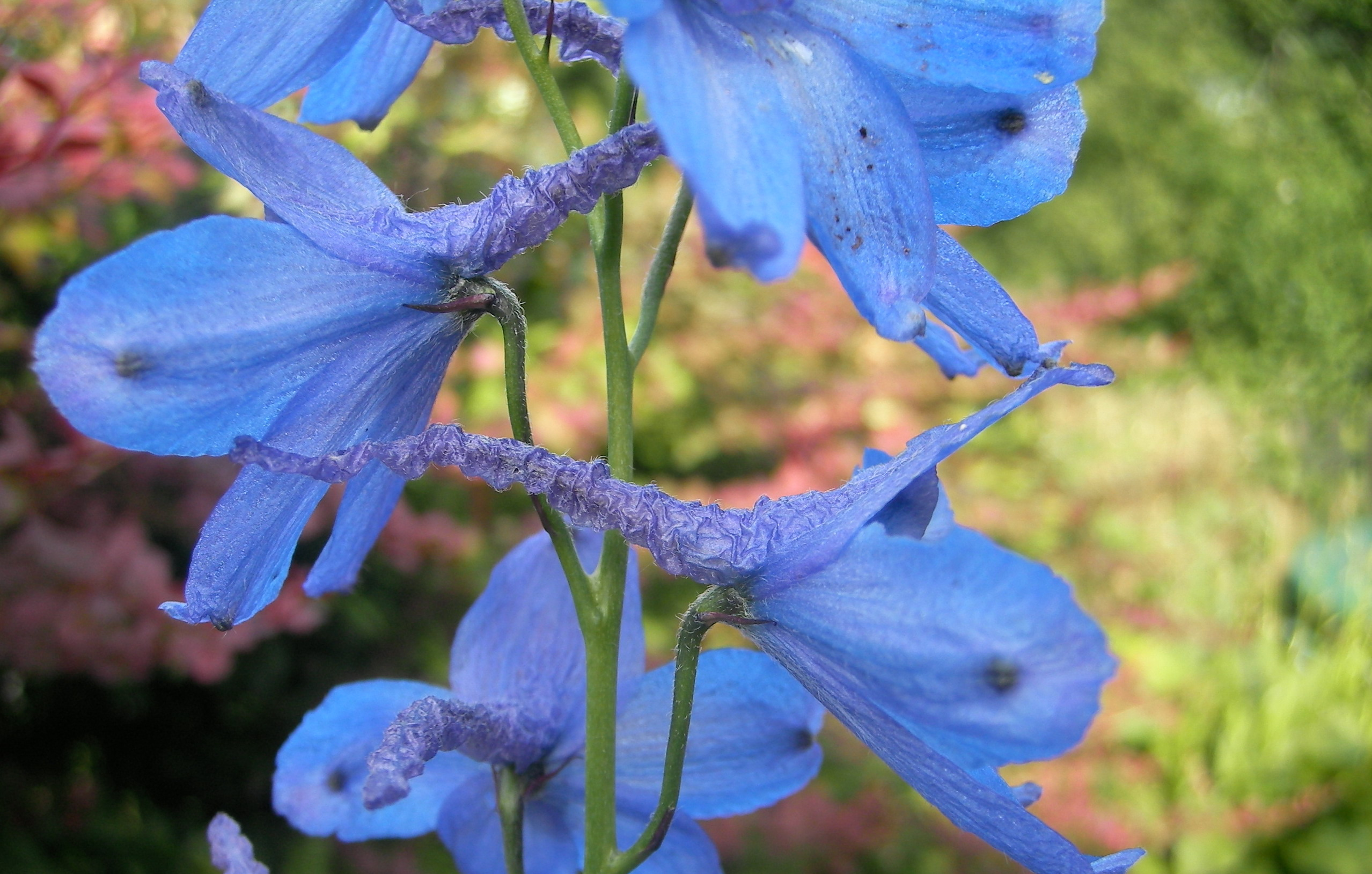

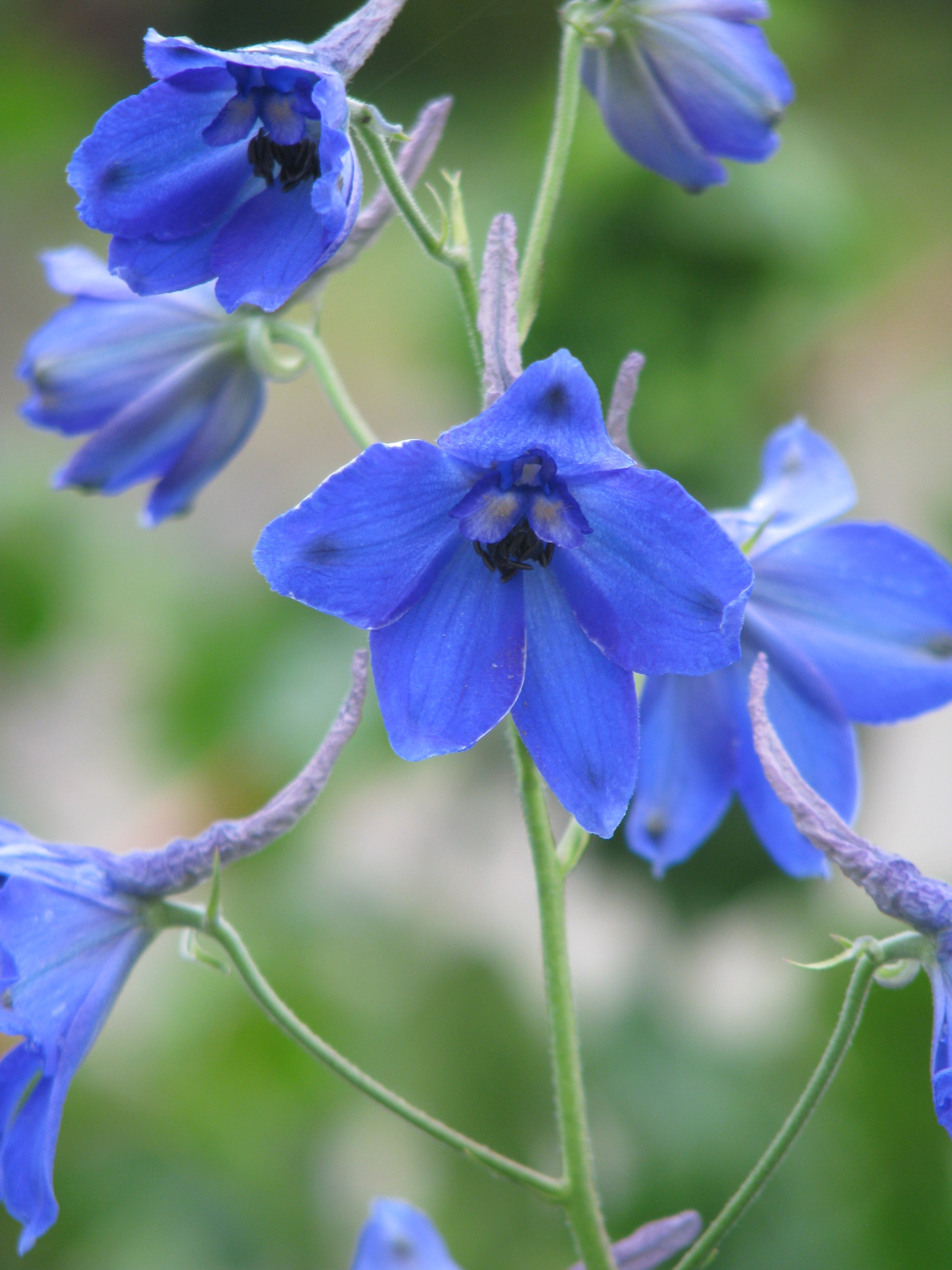
