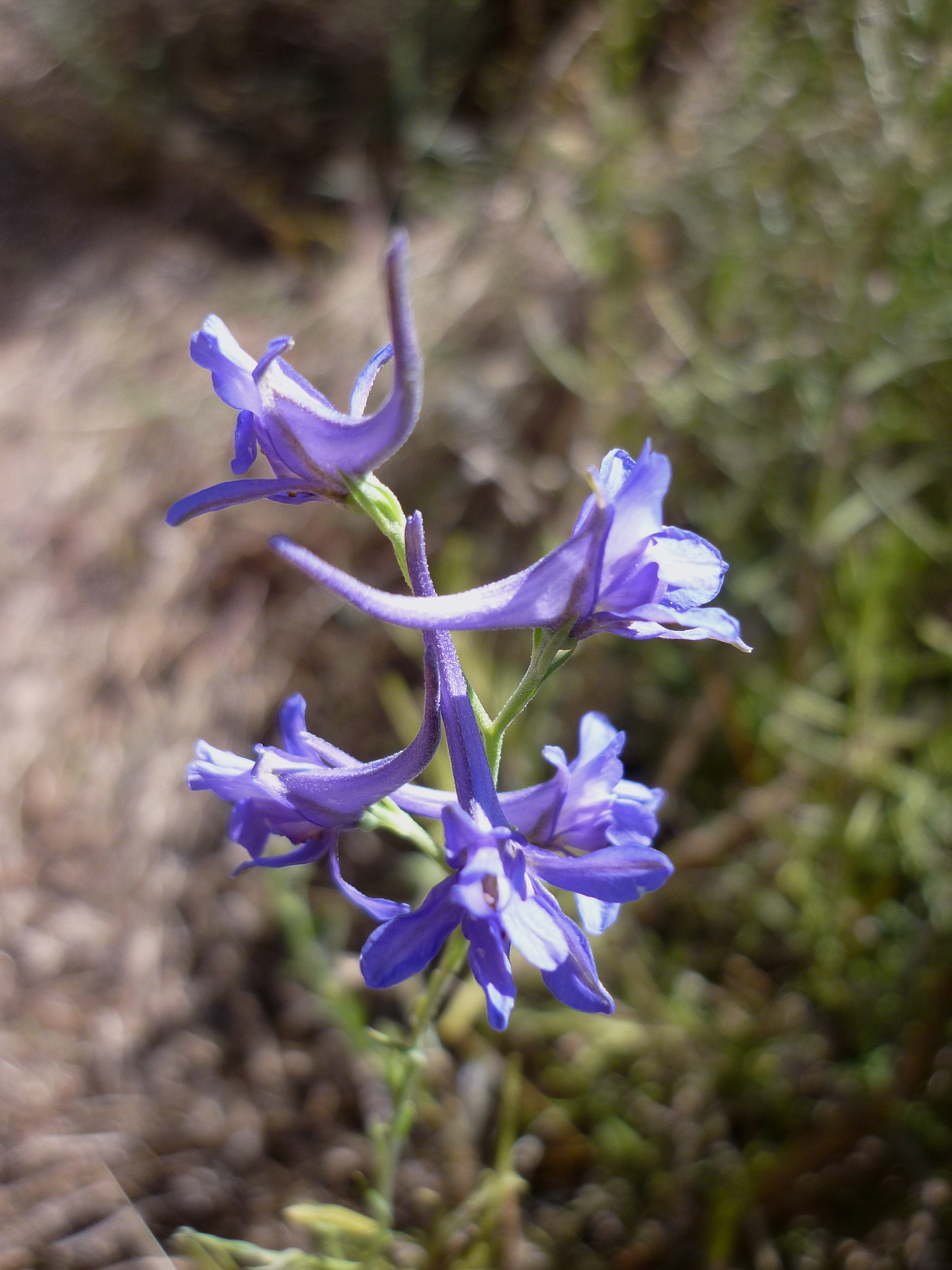

Scientific classification
- Kingdom: Plantae
- Clade: Tracheophytes
- Clade: Angiosperms
- Clade: Eudicots
- Order: Ranunculales
- Family: Ranunculaceae
- Genus: Delphinium
- Species: D. peregrinum

Binomial name
- Delphinium peregrinum L.

Synonyms
- Delphinium confertum Guss.; Delphinium eriocarpum (Boiss.) Halácsy; Delphinium forskalii Rchb.; Delphinium hirschfeldianum Heldr. & Holzm. ex Boiss.; Delphinium junceum DC.; Delphinium peregrinum subsp. junceum (DC.) Batt.; Delphinium peregrinum var. eriocarpum Boiss.; Delphinium trigynum Schott ex Willk. & Lange; Delphinium viciosoi Pau

= Delphinium peregrinum =

Species of flowering plant

Delphinium peregrinum, also commonly known as violet larkspur, is a Eurasian flowering plant, belonging to the genus Delphinium, endemic to Turkey, the Eastern Mediterranean and Western Irano-Turanian region, bearing an erect, annual stem with glabrous compound leaves and reaching a height of 27–35 cm. The plant, which blossoms between April and August, bears five colorful sepals (calyx), petaloid, the posterior sepal spurred, the two lateral sepals and the two lower sepals without spurs; while the anterior sepals can either be fused or separated. The inflorescence (corollas) are sparsely arranged, irregular, and are borne on long pedicels subtended by bracts.

The plant is readily recognized by its deep purple to lavender-coloured flowers which resemble scorpion tails (scorpioid). Flowers are pollinated by bumblebees.

== Etymology ==
The taxonomic name of the genus Delphinium is derived from the Greek word delphis meaning, dolphin, as the flower's shape was thought by the ancients to resemble a dolphin. The Modern Hebrew name given for this genus (dorbanit) takes its name from the flower's pointed-tail which resembles a long spur.

== Habitat ==
The plant grows in heavy soils, in fields where there is ample sunlight and where there is plenty of rainfall. In Israel / Palestine, it also grows on chalkstone terraces, as well as on loess soil. It is found growing in, both, cultivated and uncultivated fields, in garrigue, and in almost every place of the country.

== Toxicology ==
The stems, bulbous root, seeds (contained within 1–5 separate follicles) and leaves of the plant all contain toxins, namely, saponins and alkaloids that act on the nervous system and suppress it. The toxins are harmful to livestock when consumed by them, and have been known to pass through drinking milk, or by eating the flesh of animals that have eaten from the plant.

Medieval physician, Al-Tamimi, mentions a plant of its description growing in Palestine, and where he states that in the region of Syria (the Levant) the plant was given as an antidote to those bitten by venomous snakes and to persons stung by scorpions, the plant being ingested by them in the form of an elixir or potion, and the neurological reaction being such that it automatically cured all patients bitten or stung by these venomous creatures. Dioscorides (1st-century CE), in his Materia Medica, mentions the same thing about the flowering plant Delphinion. Science today has yet to test the effects of the plant's toxins on treating snake-bites.

A similar species of Delphinium grows in the Levant, viz., Delphinium ithaburense (Boiss.), which is distinct from its sister the violet larkspur by its fleshy-pink colour and hairy flowers.

== Bibliography ==
- Amar, Z.; Serri, Yaron (2004). The Land of Israel and Syria as Described by al-Tamimi – Jerusalem Physician of the 10th Century (in Hebrew). Ramat-Gan. ISBN 965-226-252-8. OCLC 607157392.
- Shmida, Avi (2005). MAPA's Dictionary of Plants and Flowers in Israel (in Hebrew). Tel-Aviv: MAPA Publishers. OCLC 716569354.
- Zohary, M. (1998). David Heller (ed.). A New Analytical Flora of Israel (in Hebrew) (2 ed.). Tel Aviv: Am Oved. OCLC 916628298. (first edition 1976)
