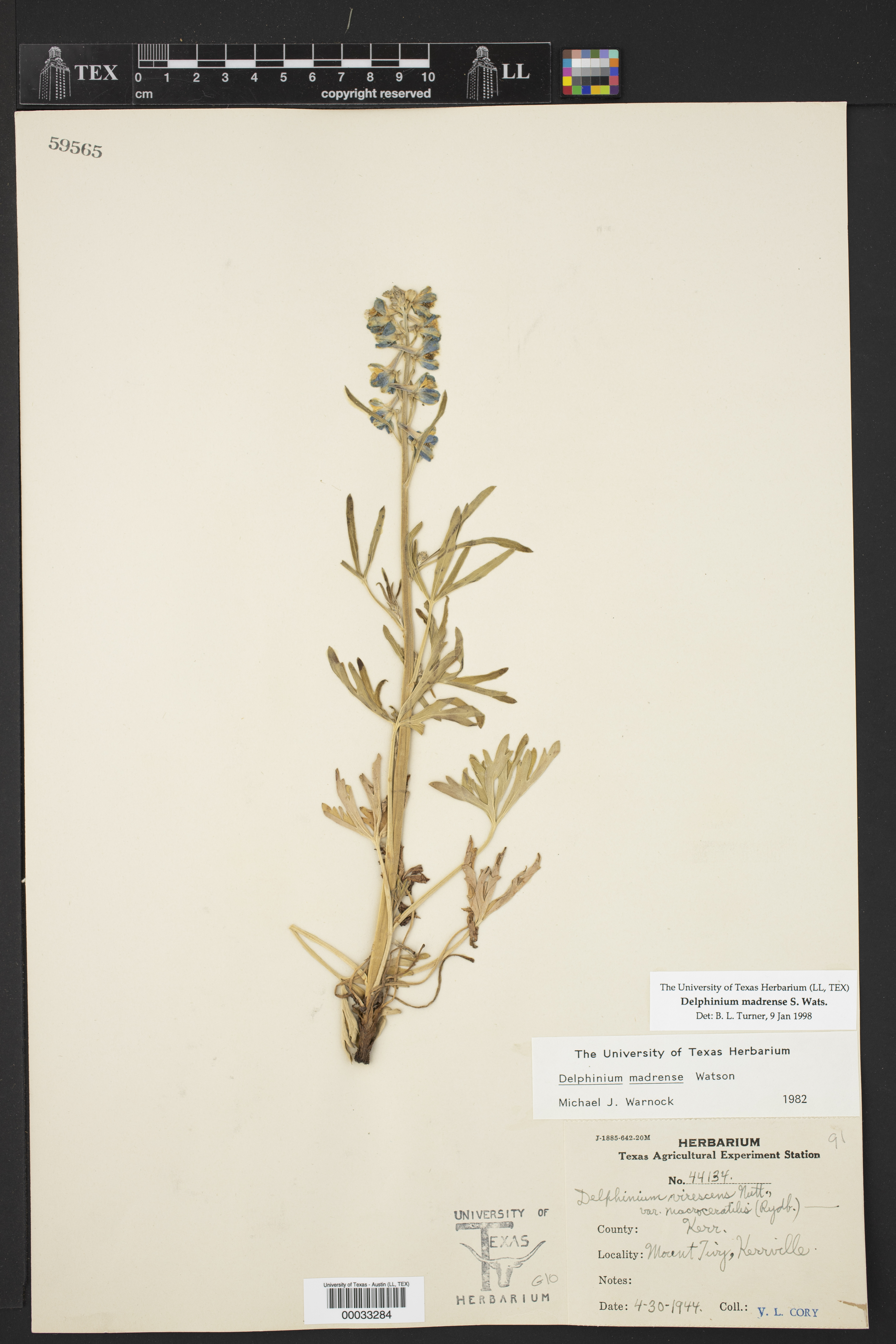

Conservation status
- Apparently Secure (NatureServe)

Scientific classification
- Kingdom: Plantae
- Clade: Tracheophytes
- Clade: Angiosperms
- Clade: Eudicots
- Order: Ranunculales
- Family: Ranunculaceae
- Genus: Delphinium
- Species: D. madrense

Binomial name
- Delphinium madrense S.Watson

= Delphinium madrense =

Species of plant

Delphinium madrense, commonly known as Sierra Madre larkspur and Edwards' Plateau larkspur, is a species of plant in the family Ranunculaceae. It is native to the south-western United States (Texas) and northern Mexico (Coahuila, Nuevo León, and Tamaulipas).

== Description ==
The stems are from 30 to 80 centimeters long. The base is often reddish and puberulent. There are both basal and cauline leaves. There are between 0-8 basal leaves at the anthesis. There are between 3-11 cauline leaves at the anthesis. The leaf blade is either semicircular or cordate. The inflorescence has 5-75 flowers on it. The flowers sepals range from dark blue to light blue in color. The lower petal blades are elevated. The fruit is between 15 and 21 centimeters long. The fruit type is follicle. The flower color could also be white, alongside blue. The bloom period is in the months of March, April, May, and June.
