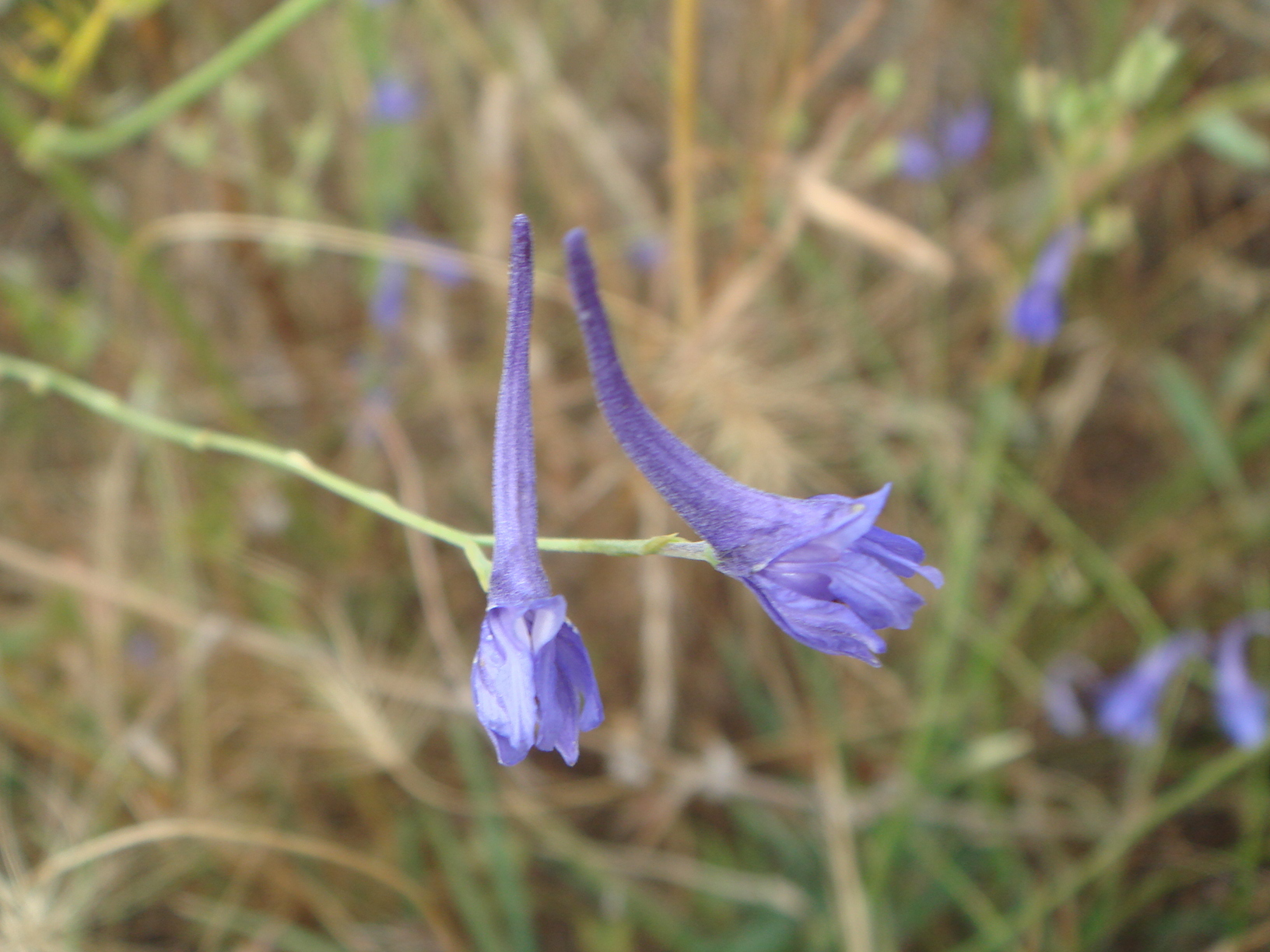
- Close-up of flowers
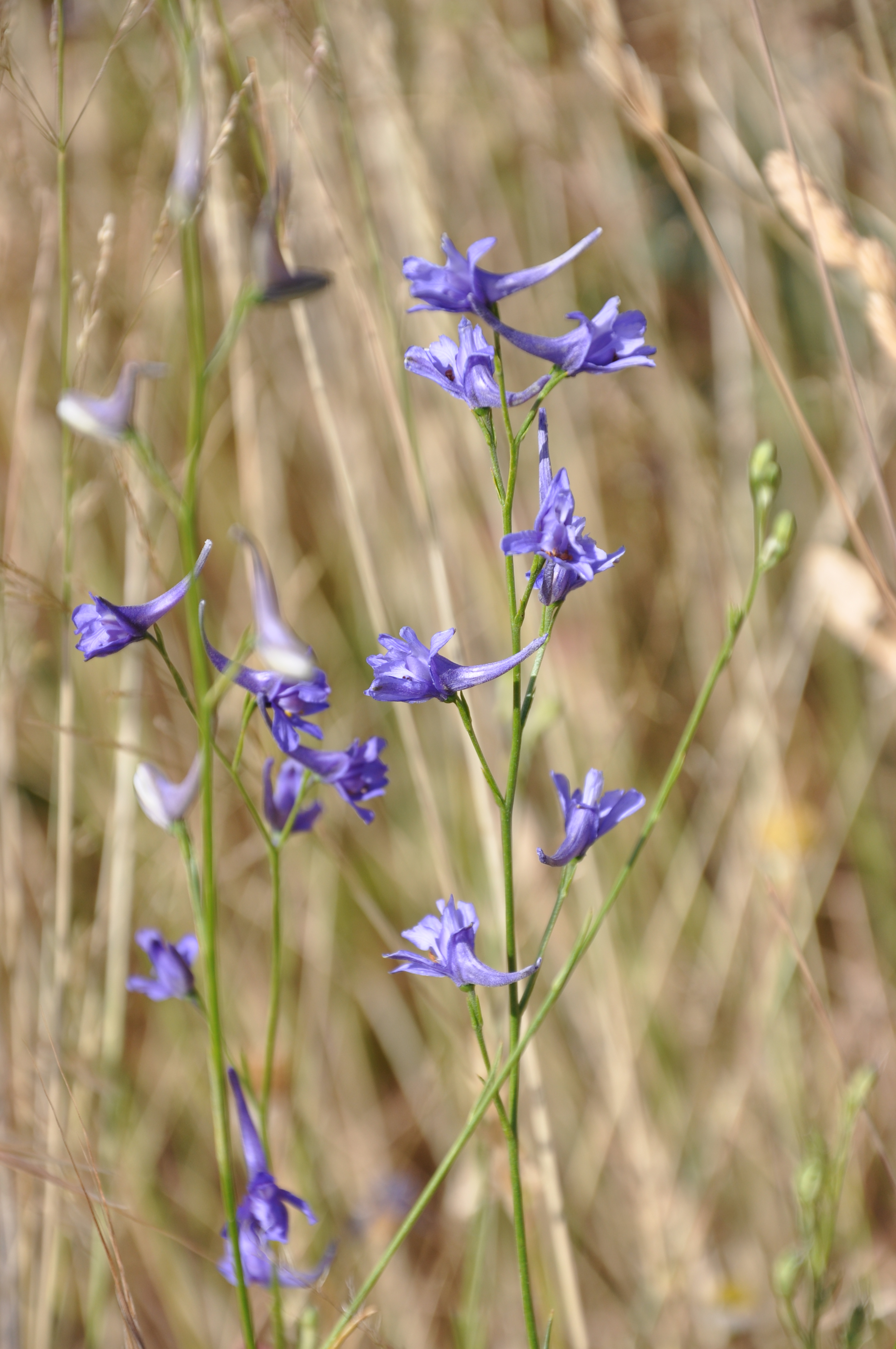
- In Ávila, Spain

Scientific classification
- Kingdom: Plantae
- Clade: Tracheophytes
- Clade: Angiosperms
- Clade: Eudicots
- Order: Ranunculales
- Family: Ranunculaceae
- Genus: Delphinium
- Species: D. gracile

Binomial name
- Delphinium gracile DC.

Synonyms
- List: Delphinium cardiopetalum var. gracile (DC.) Willk.; Delphinium gracile var. glabrum DC.; Delphinium gracile var. velutinum DC.; Delphinium nanum subsp. elongatum (Boiss.) C.Blanché, Molero & J.Simon; Delphinium peregrinum var. elongatum Boiss.; Delphinium peregrinum var. gracile (DC.) Sennen & Pau; Delphinium peregrinum subsp. gracile (DC.) Sennen & Pau; Delphinium peregrinum var. tribracteolatum (DC.) Maire; Delphinium tribracteolatum DC.

= Delphinium gracile =

Species of plant

Delphinium gracile is a species of flowering plant in the family Ranunculaceae, native to the western Mediterranean. A diterpenoid alkaloid, graciline, has been isolated from its tissues.
