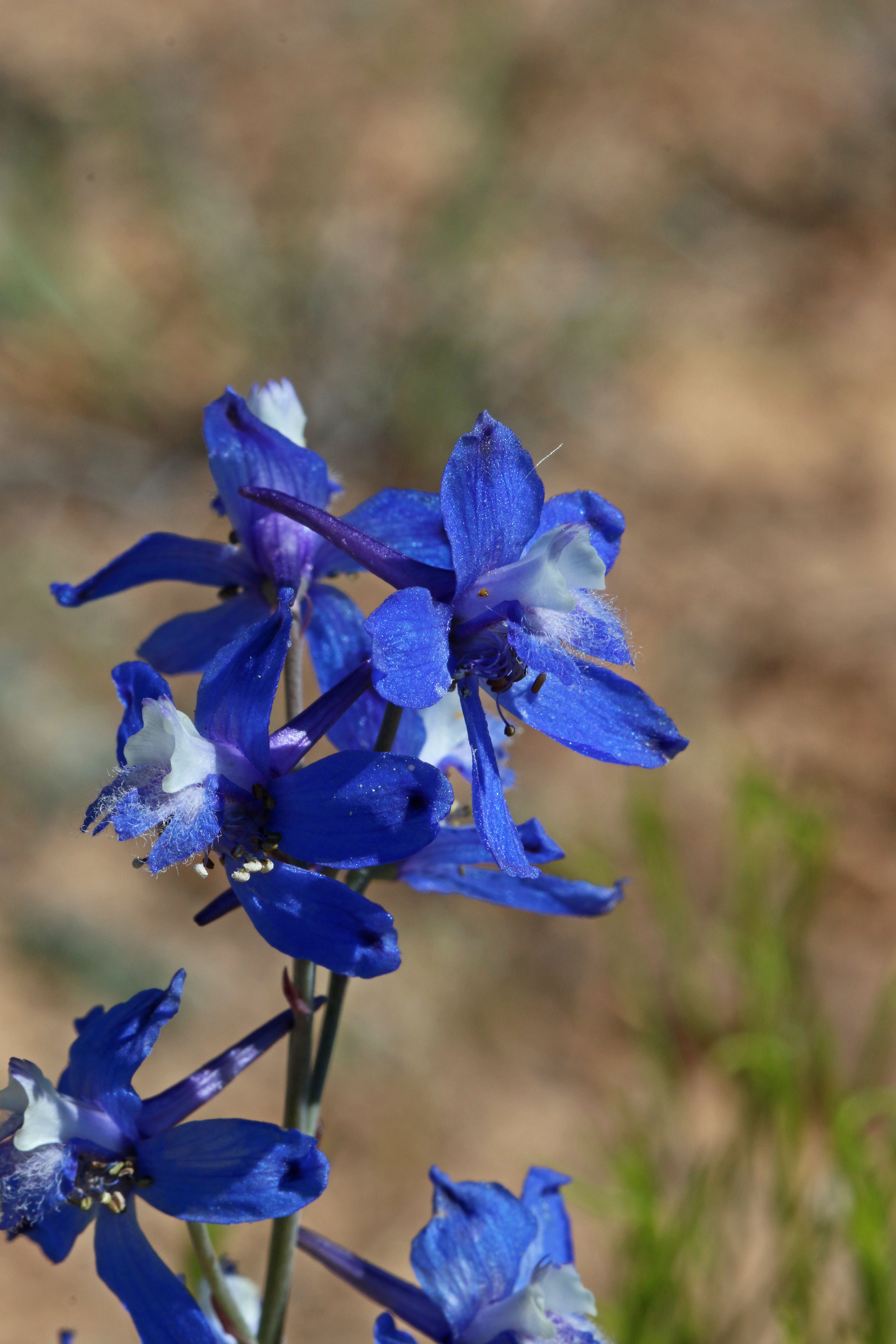
- Flowers
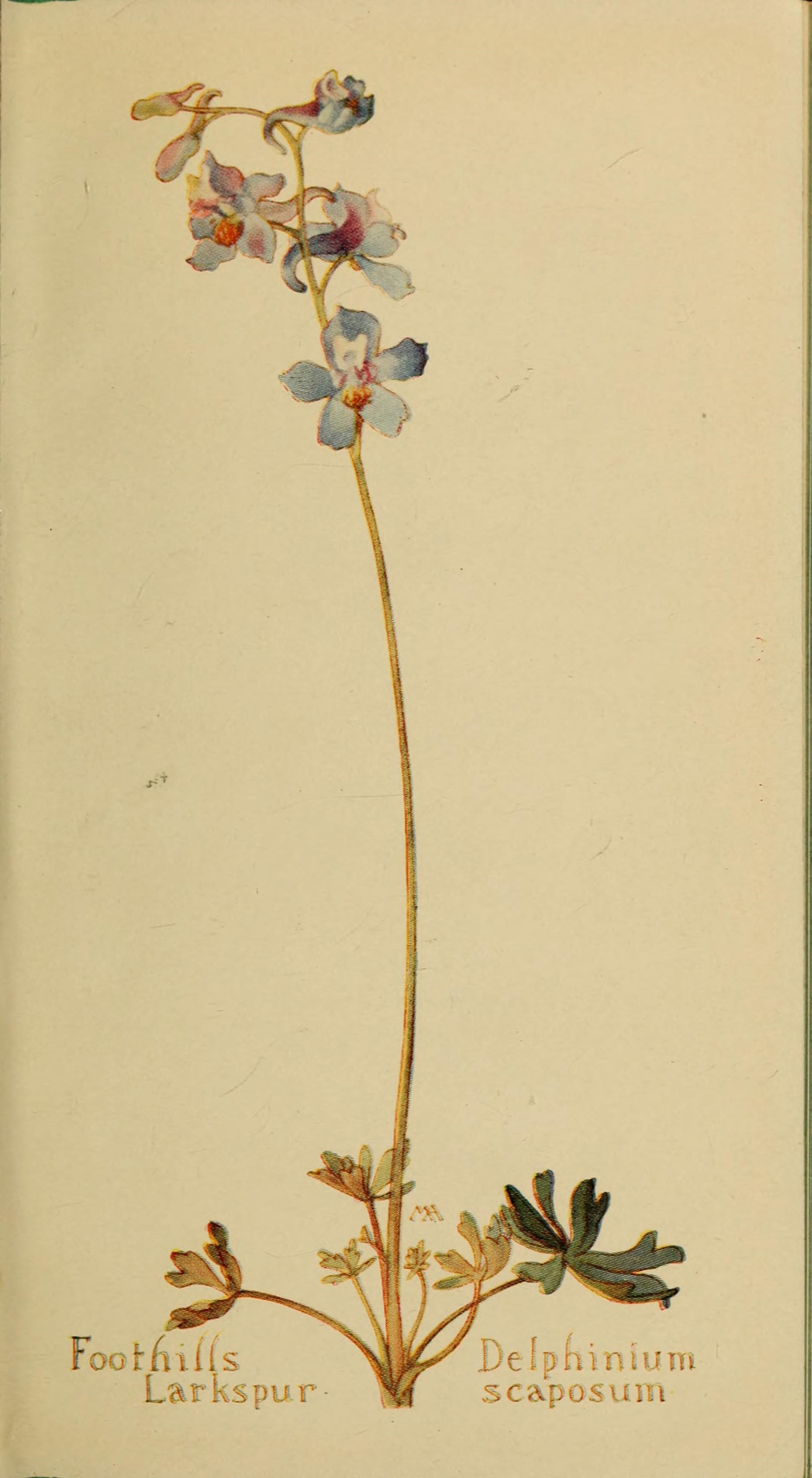
- Botanical illustration by Margaret Neilson Armstrong

Scientific classification
- Kingdom: Plantae
- Clade: Tracheophytes
- Clade: Angiosperms
- Clade: Eudicots
- Order: Ranunculales
- Family: Ranunculaceae
- Genus: Delphinium
- Species: D. scaposum

Binomial name
- Delphinium scaposum Edward Lee GreeneGreene

Synonyms
- Delphinium andersonii var. scaposum (Greene) S.L.Welsh; Delphinium decorum var. scaposum (Greene) Huth

= Delphinium scaposum =

Species of plant

Delphinium scaposum, the tall mountain larkspur or bare‑stem larkspur, is a species of flowering plant in the family Ranunculaceae. It is native to the desert southwest of the United States, and to Sonora in northwestern Mexico. A perennial reaching 60 cm (24 in), it prefers dry, gravelly soils, and is "avidly" pollinated by bumblebees and hummingbirds. Its chromosome count is 2n=16.

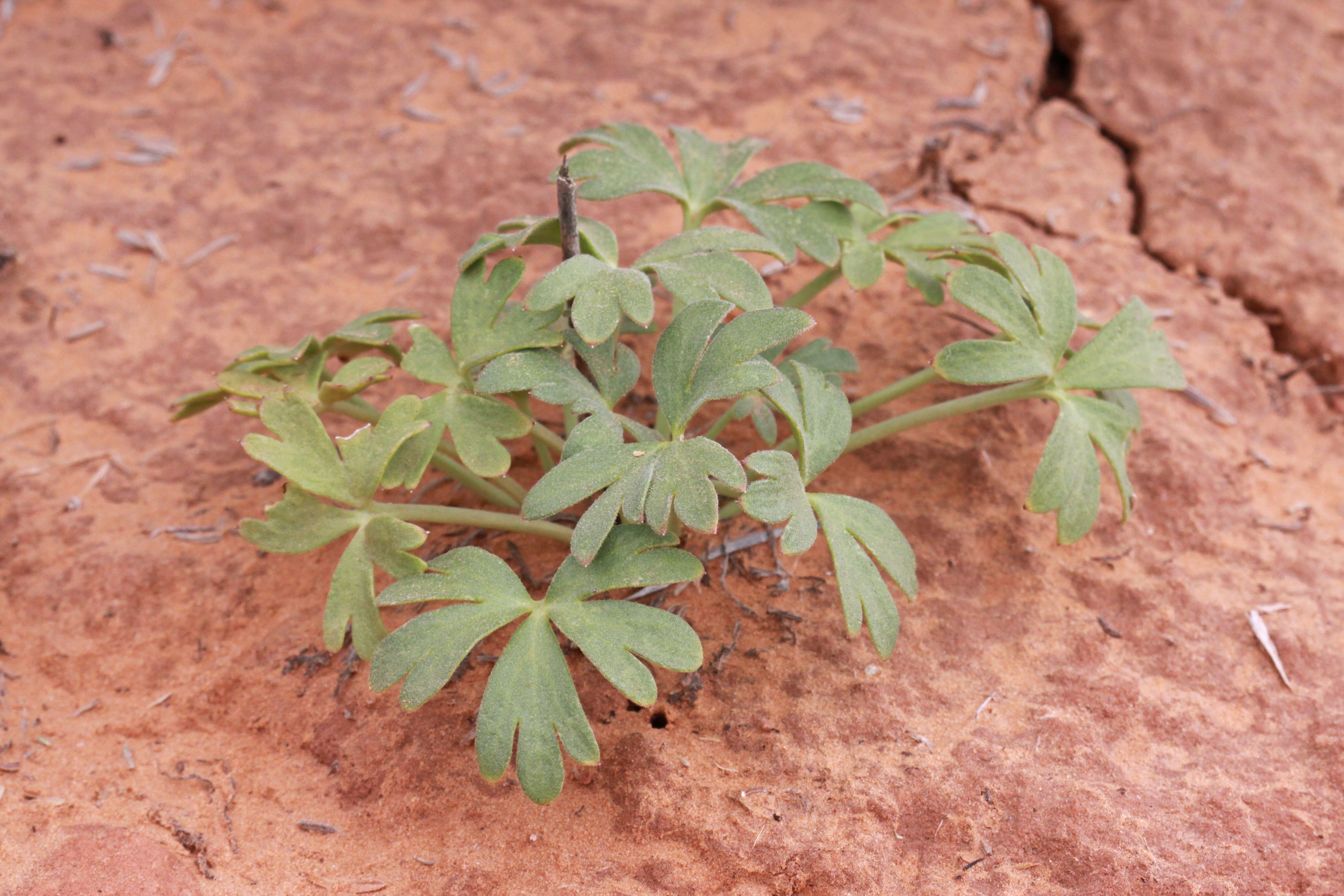
Basal rosette

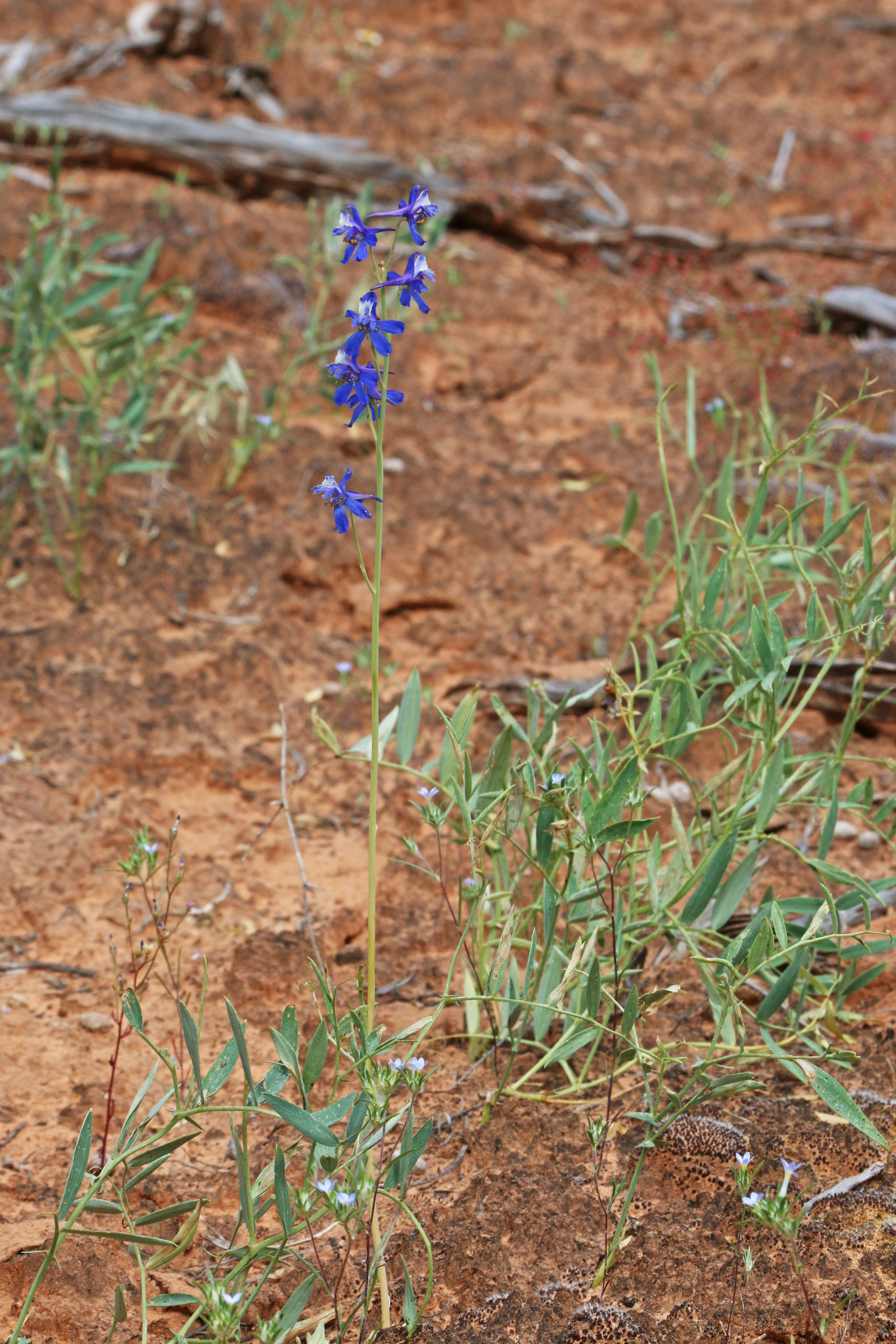
Habit

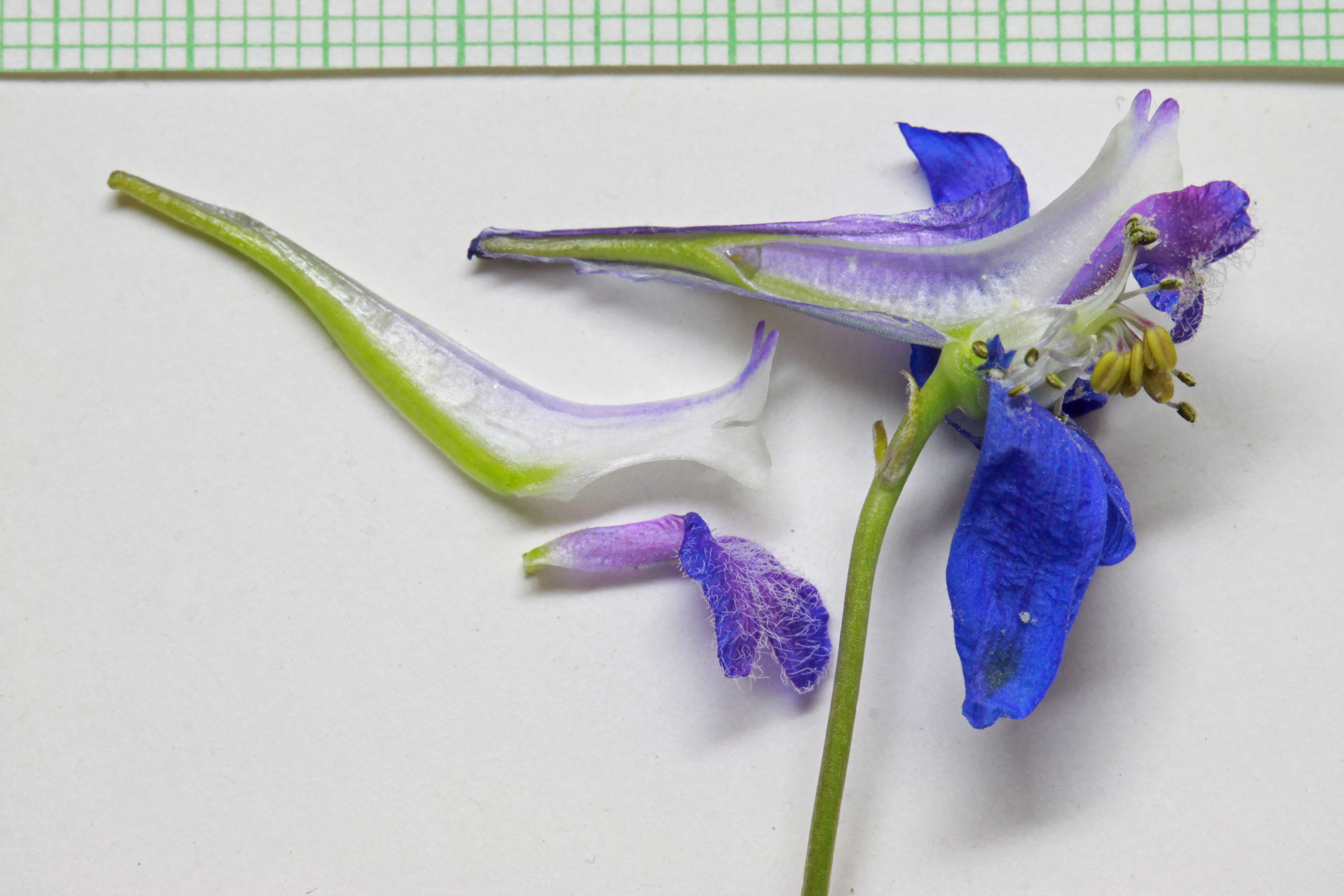
Bisected flowers
