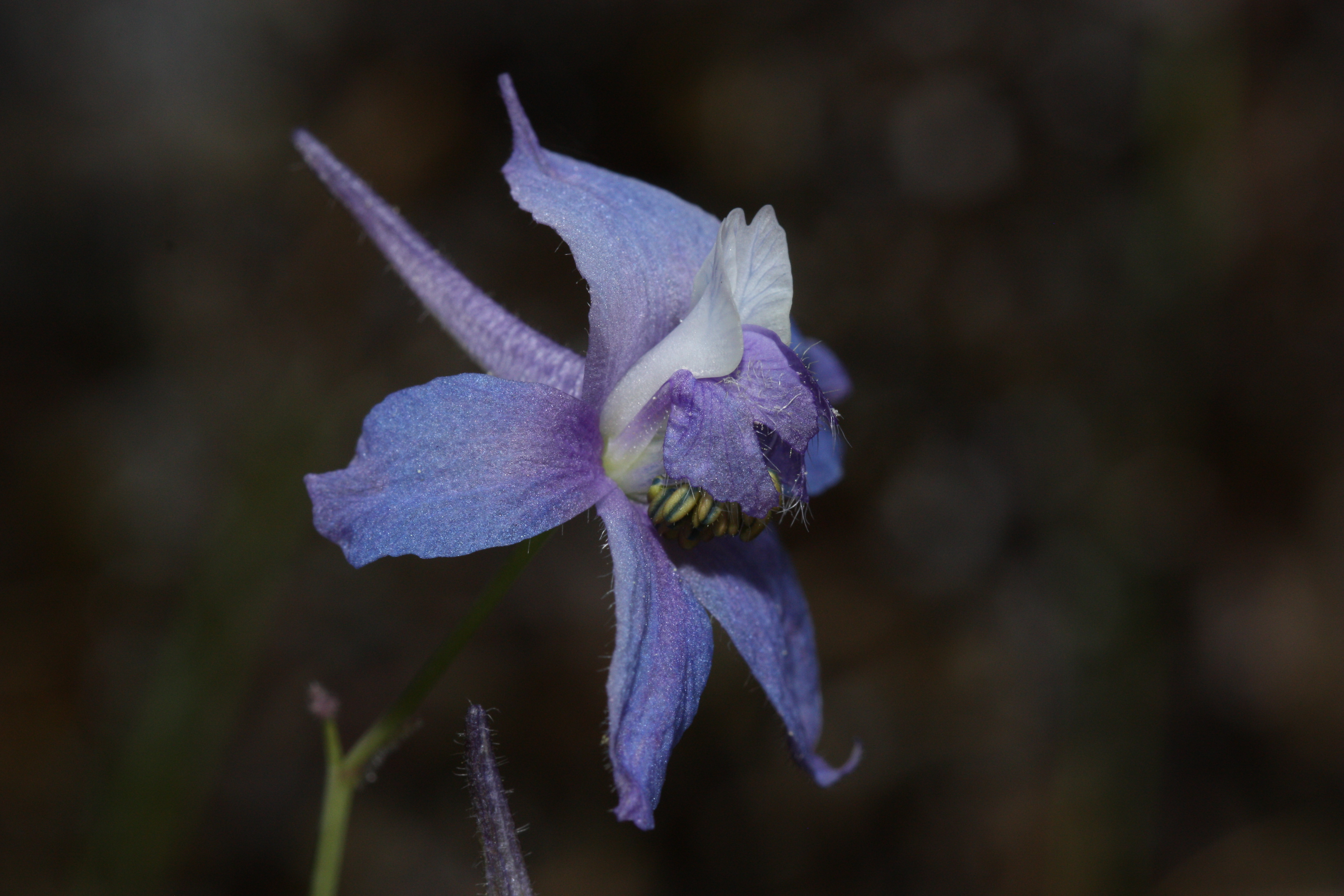
- Close-up of flower
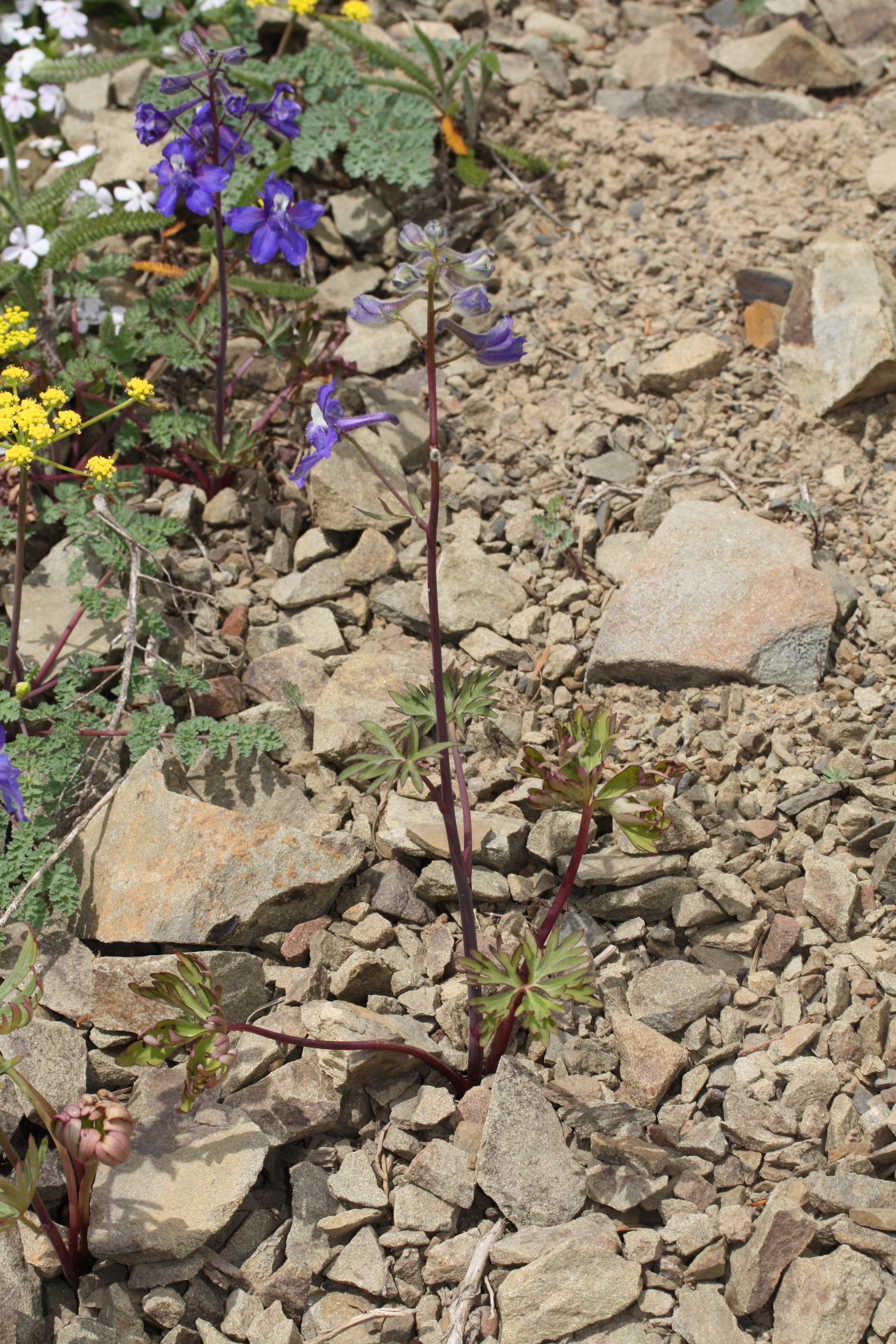
- Habit

Scientific classification
- Kingdom: Plantae
- Clade: Tracheophytes
- Clade: Angiosperms
- Clade: Eudicots
- Order: Ranunculales
- Family: Ranunculaceae
- Genus: Delphinium
- Species: D. menziesii

Binomial name
- Delphinium menziesii DC.

Synonyms
- List: Delphinastrum menziesii (DC.) Nieuwl.; Delphinium chilliwacenae Greene; Delphinium elegans DC.; Delphinium menziesii var. fulvum A.Nelson & J.F.Macbr.; Delphinium menziesii var. pauciflorum Huth; Delphinium menziesii var. pyramidale (Ewan) C.L.Hitchc.; Delphinium patens Newb.; Delphinium pauciflorum Nutt.; Delphinium pauperculum Greene; Delphinium tricorne var. menziesii (DC.) Huth

= Delphinium menziesii =

Species of plant

Delphinium menziesii, the Puget Sound larkspur, northern dwarf larkspur, or Menzies' larkspur, is a species of flowering plant in the family Ranunculaceae. It is native to British Columbia, Washington, and Oregon. A perennial reaching 75 cm (30 in), it is hummingbird pollinated.

== Subtaxa ==
The following subspecies are accepted:

- Delphinium menziesii subsp. menziesii – blue to purple sepals, entire range
- Delphinium menziesii subsp. pyramidale Ewan – yellowish to white sepals, Washington
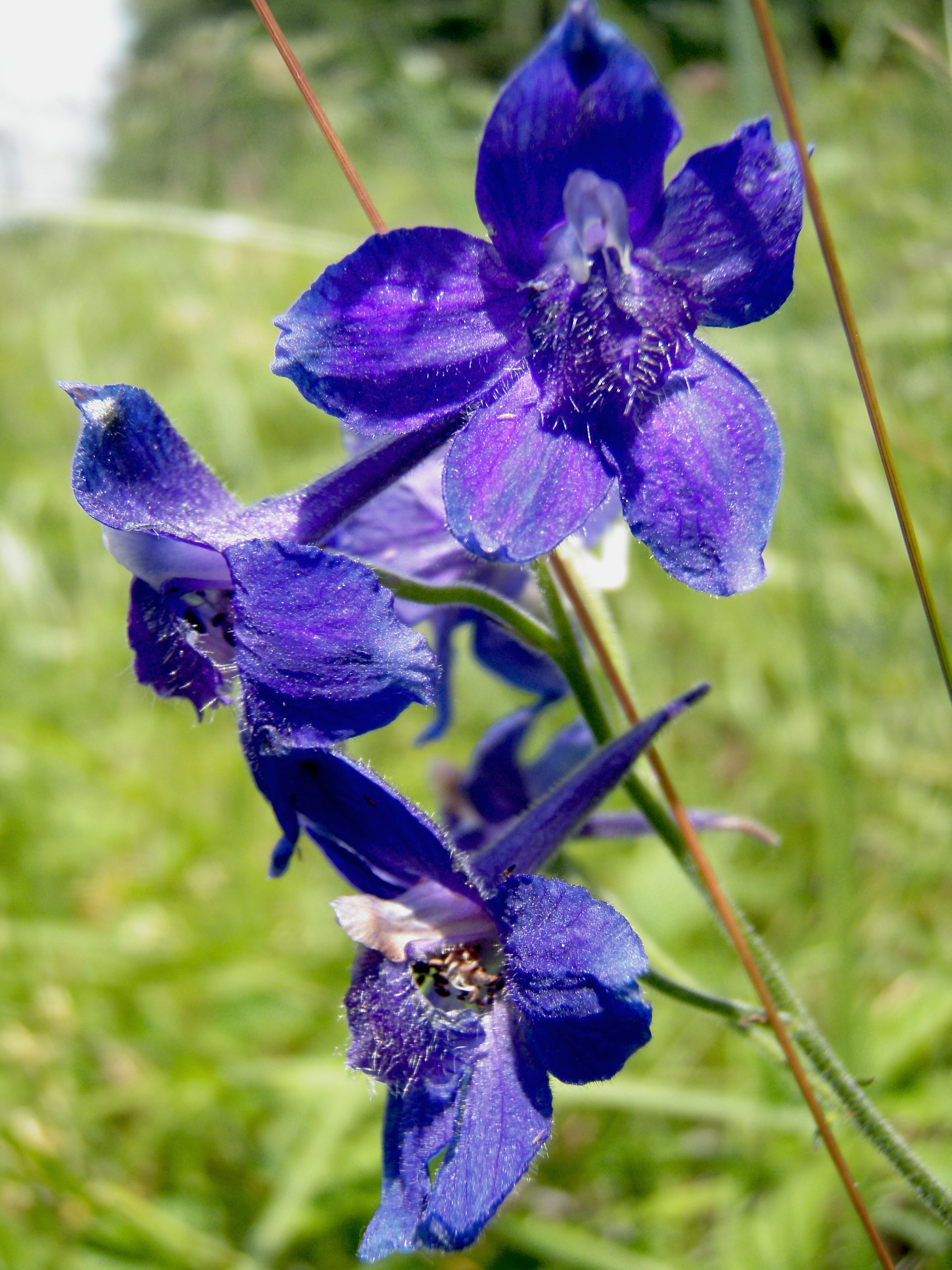
A purple-flowered individual
