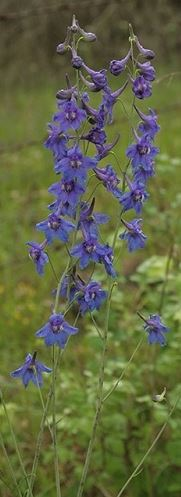

Conservation status
- Vulnerable (NatureServe)

Scientific classification
- Kingdom: Plantae
- Clade: Tracheophytes
- Clade: Angiosperms
- Clade: Eudicots
- Order: Ranunculales
- Family: Ranunculaceae
- Genus: Delphinium
- Species: D. treleasei

Binomial name
- Delphinium treleasei Bush

= Delphinium treleasei =

Species of plant

Delphinium treleasei, commonly known as named glade larkspur or Trelease's larkspur, is a perennial flowering plant found it temperate areas of the eastern United States. It is native to Missouri and Arkansas where it is often situated in limestone glades but is not common in North America. It is endemic to Ozark highlands in eight southwestern Missouri counties and eight counties in northwestern Arkansas. D. treleasei is a vascular, seed plant, part of the buttercup family (Ranunculaceae). The name Delphinium treleasei originates from the Greek "delphis" which means dolphin in reference to the flower shape of many buttercups and the specific epithet "treleasei" honors William Trelease who was director of the Missouri Botanical Garden from 1889 to 1912.

== Description ==
Delphinium treleasei grows 2–3 ft (0.61–0.91 m) tall and has loose, terminal racemes of blue to blush-purple flowers. These bloom in spring, usually May to June. Flowers are 1 in (25 mm) long, comples, asymmetrical and have five sepals, one is spurred in to a prong that coined the common name, Larkspur. Inflorescences have 5-30 flowers. Deep green leaves are narrowly and deeply divided, pedate in shape, and mostly basal. All parts of this plant are poisonous if ingested.

== Habitat ==
Delphinium treleasei natural habitat is open juniper glades on calcareous substrate.

== Conservation ==
Delphinium treleasei is locally abundant but is endemic and limited by microhabitat in its distribution range. It is vulnerable to habitat destruction. There are no current actions for conservation and D. treleasei is unlisted.
