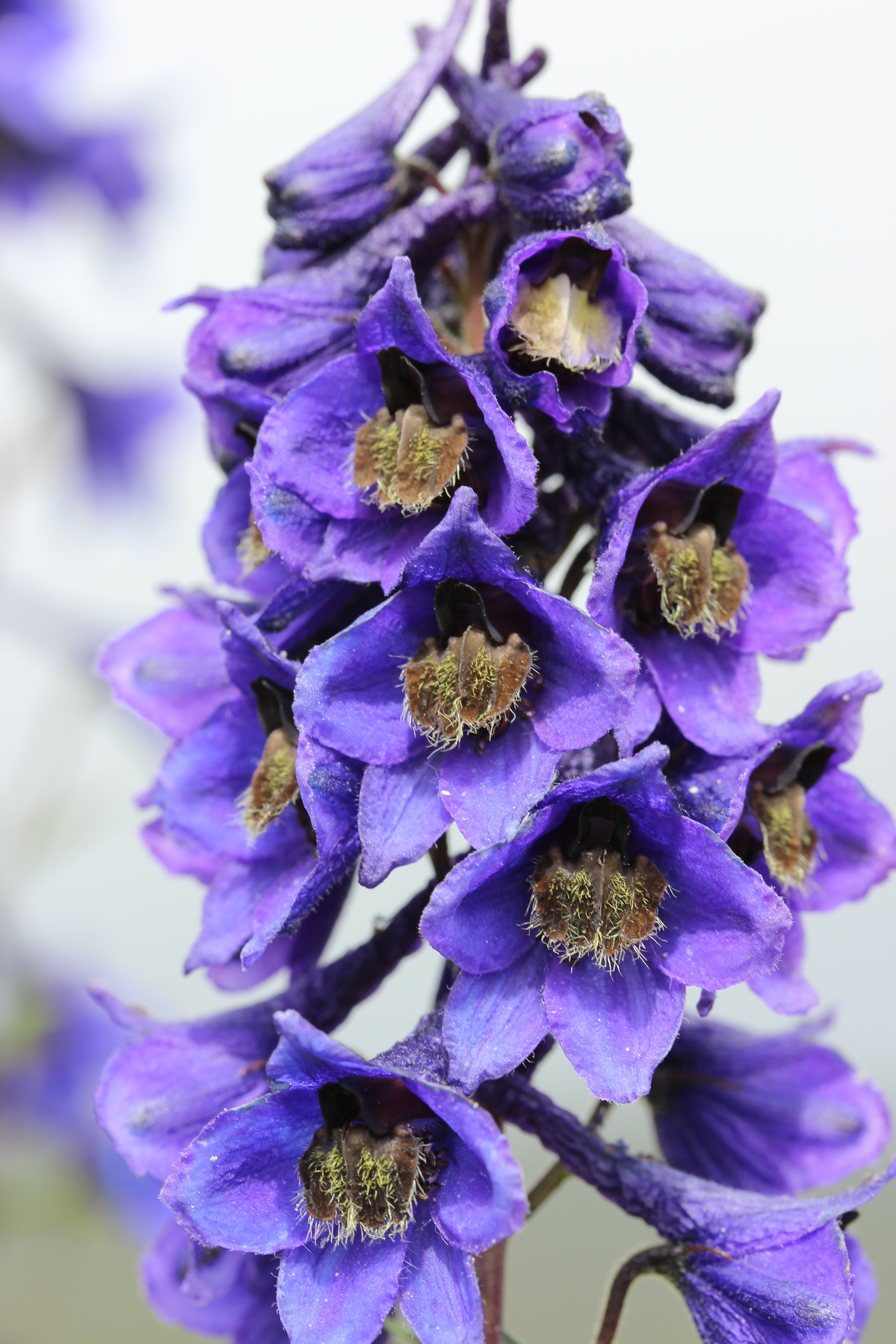

Scientific classification
- Kingdom: Plantae
- Clade: Tracheophytes
- Clade: Angiosperms
- Clade: Eudicots
- Order: Ranunculales
- Family: Ranunculaceae
- Genus: Delphinium
- Species: D. elatum

Binomial name
- Delphinium elatum L.

= Delphinium elatum =

Species of plant

Delphinium elatum is a species of flowering plant in the buttercup family Ranunculaceae, known by the common names alpine delphinium, bee larkspur, or candle larkspur. It is native to temperate Asia and Europe, it is an erect herbaceous perennial growing to 1.8 m (5.9 ft), with deeply divided leaves. It produces spikes of blue or purple flowers in summer.

== Taxonomy ==
Delphinium elatum was one of the many species described by Carl Linnaeus in his 1753 work Species Plantarum.

== Cultivation ==
It is hardy down to −20 °C (−4 °F), but requires a sheltered position in full sun, and deep, rich soil. All plants must be securely staked to avoid the flower heads collapsing. Gloves should be worn when handling the plant, as it can cause severe discomfort if accidentally ingested.

Delphinium elatum is a source of many ornamental cultivars in a range of colours from blue and purple to pink, cream, and white.

Cultivar series include Magic Fountains, Pacific giant, Dwarf Pacific, New Millennium, and Aurora (six varieties: Blue, Deep Purple, Lavender, Light Blue, Light Purple and White).

The following cultivars have received the Royal Horticultural Society's Award of Garden Merit:

- 'Lord Butler'
- 'Sungleam'
- 'Sweethearts' (New Millennium Series)

== Chemical ==
Seven C19-norditerpenoid alkaloids can be isolated from Delphinium elatum: N-formyl-4, 19-secopacinine, iminoisodelpheline, iminodelpheline, iminopaciline, 6-dehydroeladine, elpacidine, and melpheline.
