= C24H39NO7 =

The molecular formula C_{24}H_{39}NO_{7} (molar mass: 453.576 g/mol, exact mass: 453.2727 u) may refer to:

- Delcosine
- Gigactonine
- Vinervine
