= C25H41NO7 =

The molecular formula C_{25}H_{41}NO_{7} (molar mass: 467.60 g/mol, exact mass: 467.2883 u) may refer to:

- Delsoline
- Lycoctonine
