= C. armeniaca =

C. armeniaca may refer to:

- Consolida armeniaca, a plant species
- Cypraea armeniaca, a snail species in the genus Cypraea

== See also ==
- Armeniaca (disambiguation)
