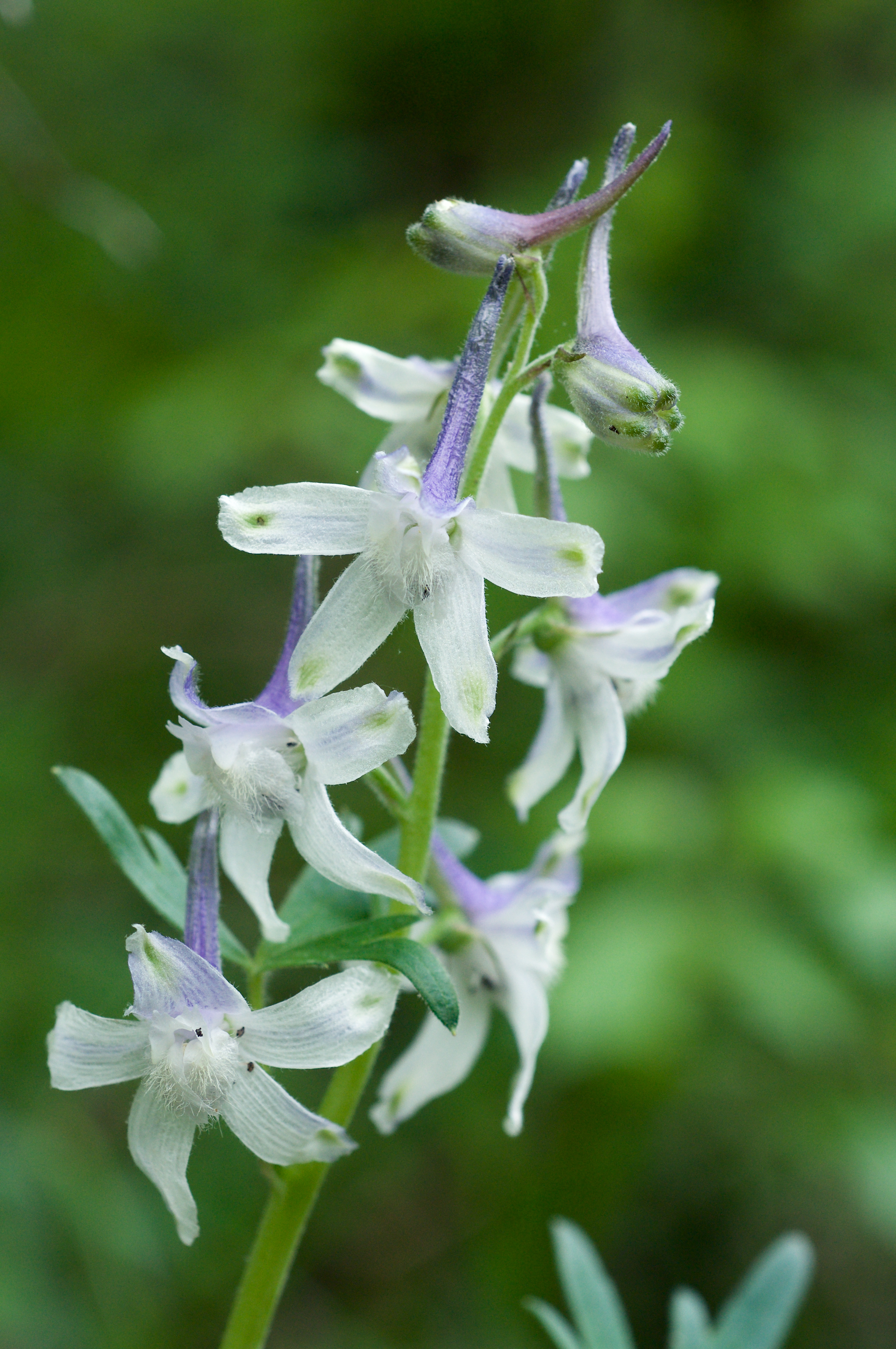

Conservation status
- Secure (NatureServe)

Scientific classification
- Kingdom: Plantae
- Clade: Tracheophytes
- Clade: Angiosperms
- Clade: Eudicots
- Order: Ranunculales
- Family: Ranunculaceae
- Genus: Delphinium
- Species: D. tricorne

Binomial name
- Delphinium tricorne Michx.

= Delphinium tricorne =

Species of flowering plant

Delphinium tricorne, known by the common names dwarf larkspur or spring larkspur, is a species of flowering plant in the Ranunculaceae (buttercup) family. It is native to the central and eastern United States, where it is the most common Delphinium found.

== Description ==
D. tricorne is a perennial plant that grows to a height of 15–45 centimetres (6–18 in), with a thin flowering stalk rising from a group of basal leaves. There are a few alternate leaves along the stalk. All the leaves are grayish green to green, and deeply divided into about 5 lobes that are then each divided further into 2 or 3 secondary lobes. The basal leaves are up to 10 centimetres (4 in) long and across.

The inflorescence is a raceme at the end of the stalk consisting of 6 to 24 flowers that are violet, blue, white, or a mixture of these colors. The flowers have 4 to 5 sepals and a long, narrow spur in the back. They are 1–1.5 inches (3–4 cm) long. The flowers bloom from March to May.

== Etymology ==
The genus name, Delphinium, comes from the Greek word for "dolphin", and may refer to the shape of the flowers. The specific epithet, tricorne, is Latin for "with three horns", which describes the shape of the fruit.

== Distribution and habitat ==
D. tricorne is native to portions of the central and eastern United States from eastern Nebraska to the west, southwestern Pennsylvania to the east, the Carolinas and Georgia to eastern Oklahoma to the south, and Minnesota to the north. It is found in rich mesic forests and moist prairies, often over calcareous or mafic rocks, or less commonly over very fertile alluvium deposits.

== Ecology ==
The plant is pollinated by bumblebees and hummingbirds, and several other species of bees visit the flowers for nectar and pollen.

== Toxicity ==
The diterpenoid alkaloids lycoctonine and tricornine (otherwise known as lycoctonine-18-O-acetate) have been isolated from D. tricorne. The toxicology and pharmacology of lycoctonine have been quite well studied, but there is only limited information available concerning the biological properties of tricornine. Both alkaloids have neuro-muscular blocking properties, and D. tricorne should be treated as a potentially poisonous plant. This species has long been regarded as poisonous to livestock.
