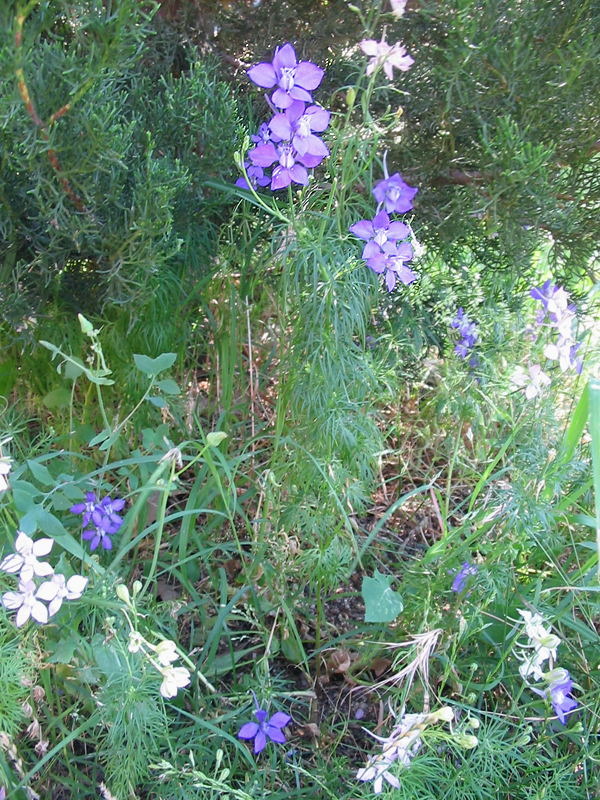

Scientific classification
- Kingdom: Plantae
- Clade: Tracheophytes
- Clade: Angiosperms
- Clade: Eudicots
- Order: Ranunculales
- Family: Ranunculaceae
- Genus: Consolida
- Species: C. ajacis

Binomial name
- Consolida ajacis (L.) Schur

Synonyms
- Consolida ambigua; Delphinium ajacis; Delphinium ambiguum

= Consolida ajacis =

Species of plant

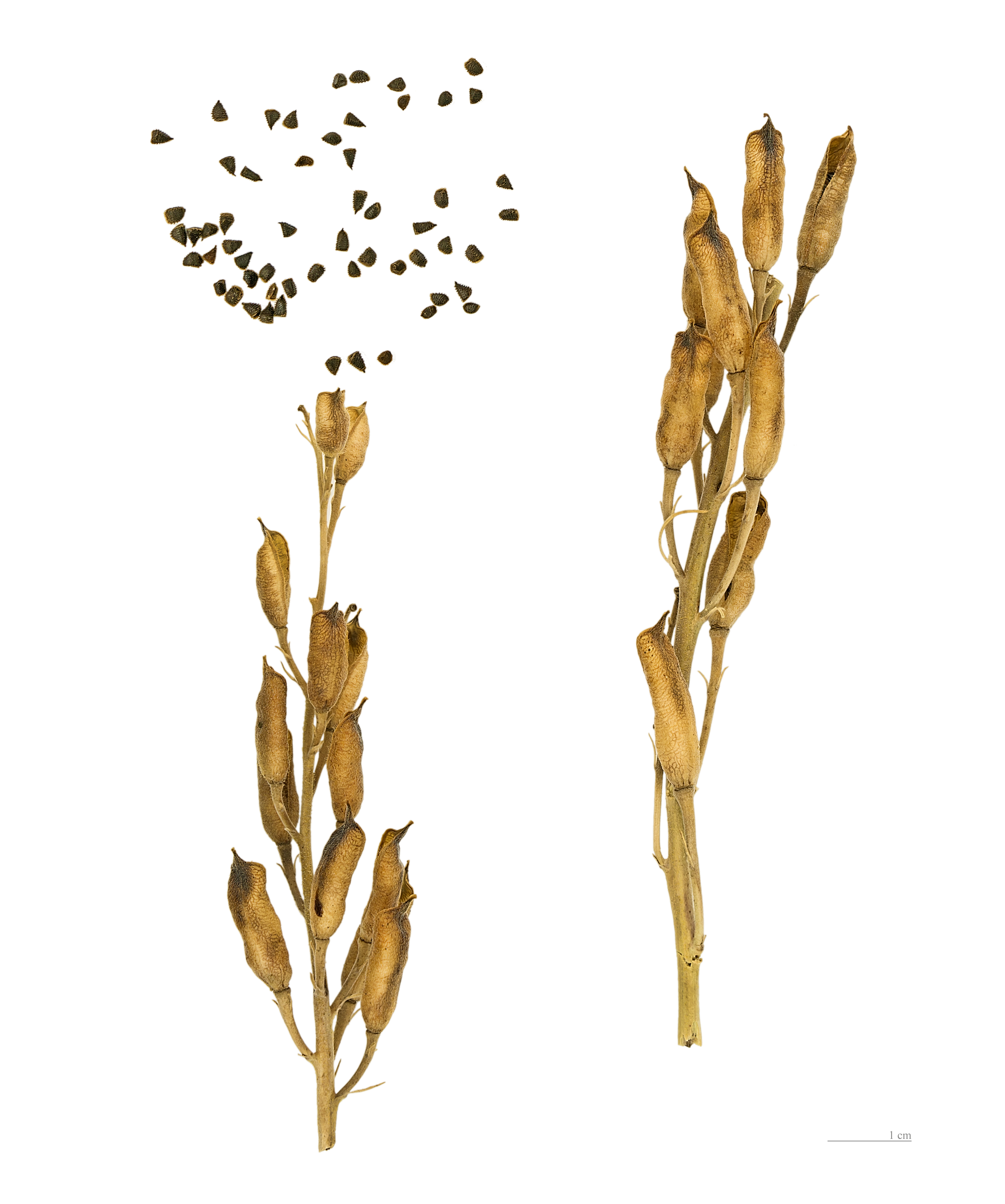
Follicles and seeds - MHNT

Consolida ajacis (doubtful knight's spur or rocket larkspur) is an annual flowering plant of the family Ranunculaceae native to Eurasia. It is widespread in other areas, including much of North America, where it is an introduced species. It is frequently grown in gardens as an ornamental for its spikes of blue, pink or white flowers. It may reach a meter in height. Since the aerial parts and seeds of C. ajacis have been found to contain diterpenoid alkaloids (see chemical constituents below), including the highly toxic methyllycaconitine, the plants should be considered as poisonous.

== Sowing ==
In the UK, Consolida ajacis can be sowed under cover between February and April, or directly outdoors between April and May and/or late August and September.

== Flowering ==
In Europe, it flowers between June and October.

== Chemical constituents ==
The first alkaloid to be isolated from C. ajacis seeds was ajaconine, reported by Keller and Volker in 1914. Since that time, over thirty other structurally related diterpenoid alkaloids have been reported; these are:

- 14-acetylbrowniine
- 14-acetyldelcosine
- 14-acetyldelectine
- 13-O-acetylvakhmatine
- ajabicine
- ajacine
- ajacusine
- ajadelphine
- ajadelphinine
- ajadine
- ajadinine
- ajanine
- ambiguine
- anthranoyllycoctonine
- browniine
- 14-deacetylajadine
- 14-deacetylambiguine
- delajacine
- delajacirine
- delajadine
- delcosine
- delectine
- delphatine
- delpheline
- delphisine
- delsoline
- deltaline
- deltatsine
- dihydroajaconine
- gigactonine
- lycoctonine
- 18-methoxygadesine
- methyllycaconitine
- 19-oxoanthranoyllycoctonine
- 19-oxodelphatine
- takaosamine
- vakhmatine

== Gallery ==
Leaf morphology

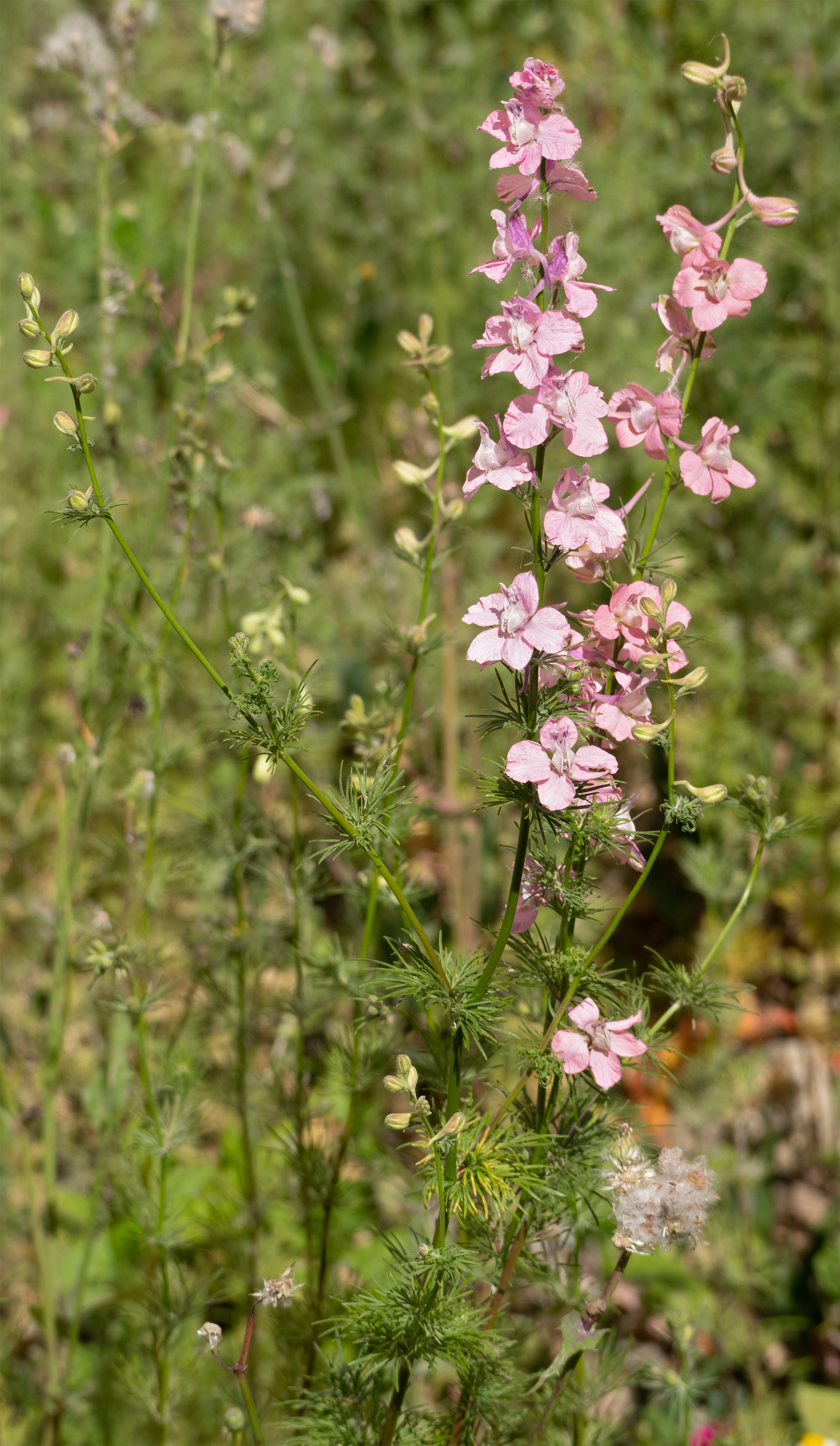
In Spain

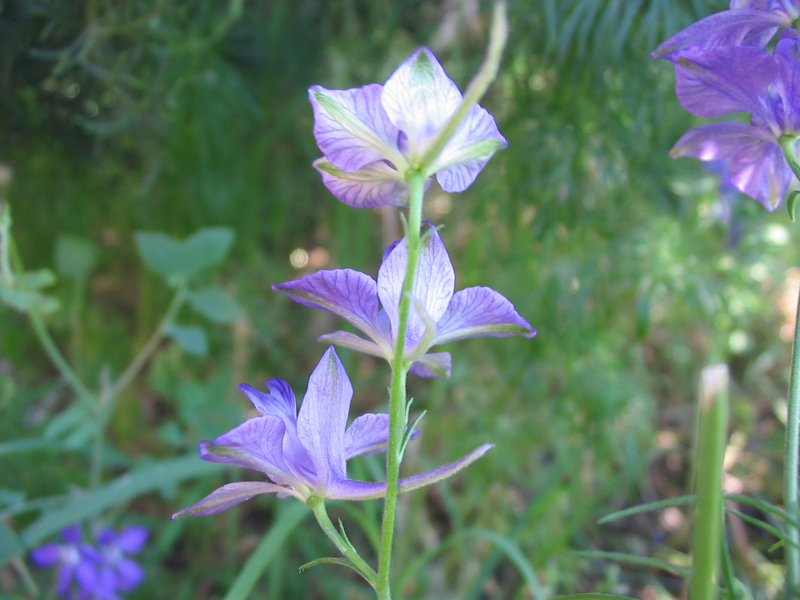
In Spain

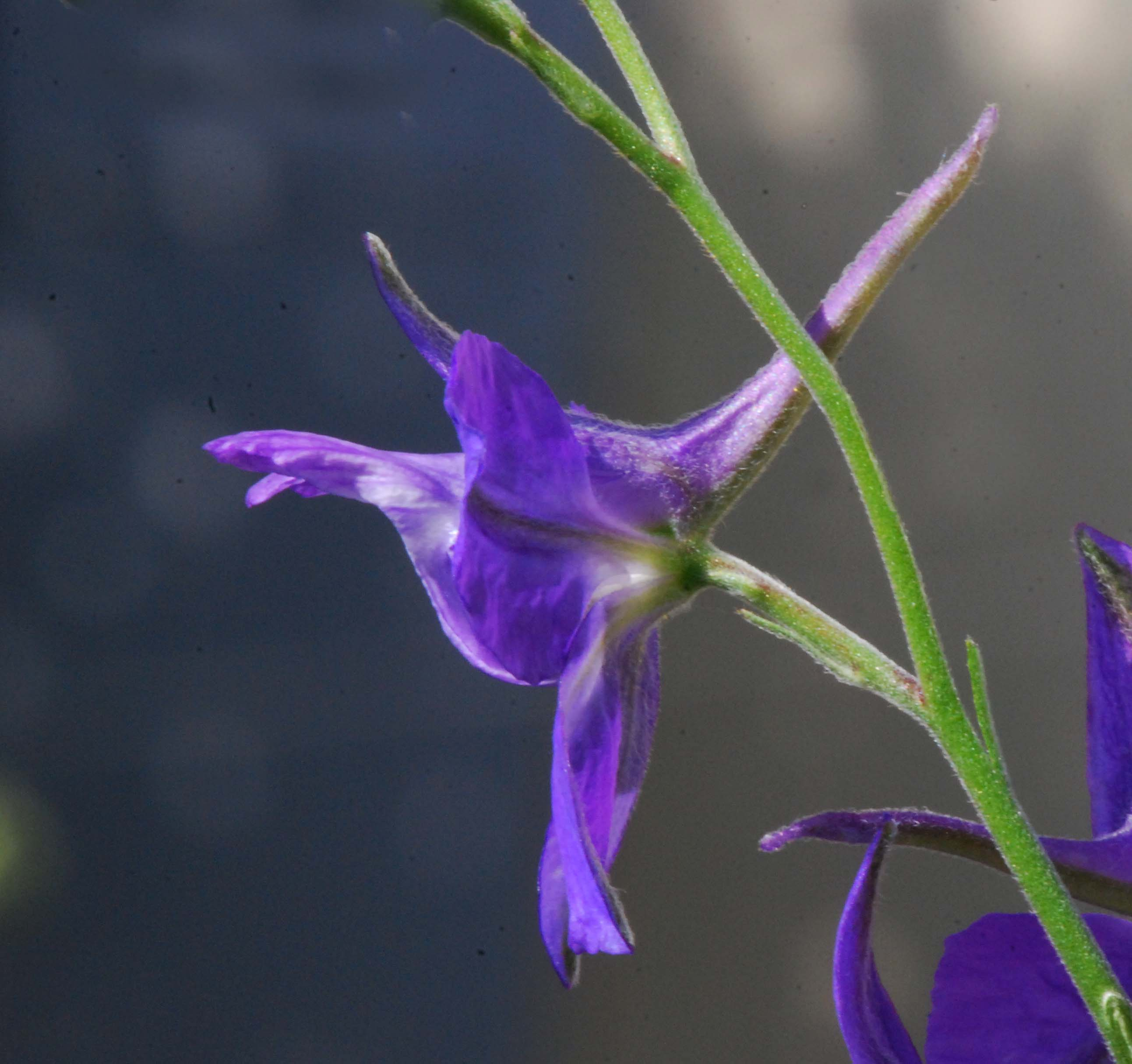
In France
