= Methyllycaconitine =

Chemical compound

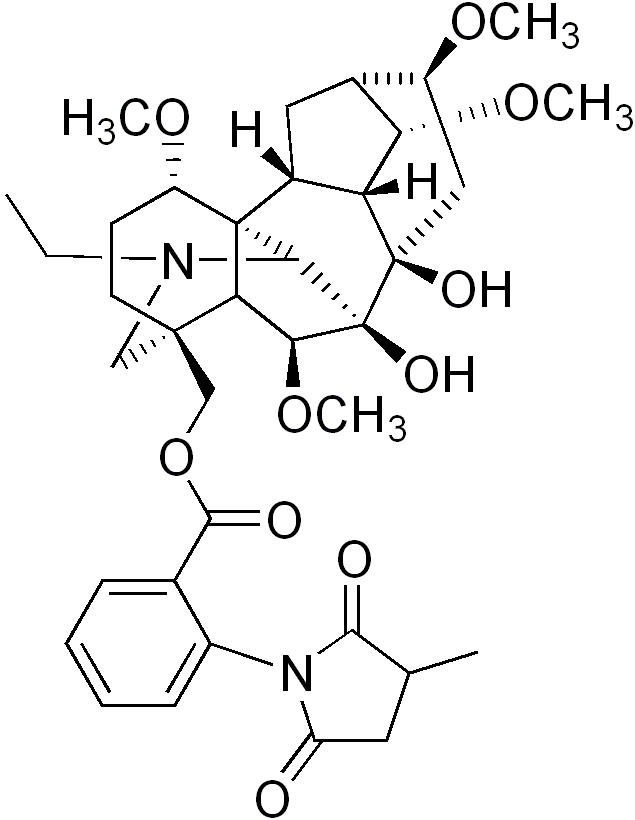

Identifiers
- CAS Number: 21019-30-7
- PubChem CID: 5311278
- ChemSpider: 4470788
- UNII: 8H7EX9Z9QE
- ChEBI: CHEBI:43931
- ChEMBL: ChEMBL510275
- CompTox Dashboard (EPA): DTXSID80943320

Chemical and physical data
- Formula: C_{37}H_{50}N_{2}O_{10}
- Molar mass: 682.811 g·mol^{−1}
- 3D model (JSmol): Interactive image
- SMILES: CCN1CC2(CCC(C34C2C(C(C31)(C5(CC(C6CC4C5C6OC)OC)O)O)OC)OC)COC(=O)C7=CC=CC=C7N8C(=O)CC(C8=O)C

Methyllycaconitine (MLA) is a diterpenoid alkaloid found in many species of Delphinium (larkspurs). In common with many other diterpenoid alkaloids, it is toxic to animals, although the acute toxicity varies with species. Methyllycaconitine was identified one of the principal toxins in larkspurs responsible for livestock poisoning in the mountain rangelands of North America. Methyllycaconitine has been explored as a possible therapeutic agent for the treatment of spastic paralysis, and it has been shown to have insecticidal properties. It has become an important molecular probe for studying the pharmacology of the nicotinic acetylcholine receptor.

== Isolation ==
MLA was first isolated from Delphinium brownii, Rydb. Presumably because he did not obtain the compound in sufficiently pure form, Manske declined to give it a name. The name "methyl-lycaconitine" was assigned by John Goodson, working at the Wellcome Chemical Research Laboratories in London, England, when he isolated the alkaloid, in purer form, from seeds of Delphinium elatum, L. in 1943. A more modern isolation procedure is described by Pelletier and his co-workers, who used seeds of the "garden larkspur", Consolida ambigua (also referred to as Delphinium ajacis) as their plant source.

== Structure determination ==
The complete molecular structure for MLA, correct in all but one detail, was first published by Kuzovkov and Platonova in 1959. This structure, supported in part by X-ray crystallography (considered usually to be a "definitive" analytical technique) of a chemical derivative of MLA performed by Maria Przybylska, was accepted as correct until the early 1980s. The stereochemistry of the methoxy group at C-1 from the β- to α- configuration has been determined. Thus any drawing of MLA appearing before Pelletier's 1981 paper will show the structure with the incorrect stereochemistry at C-1.

== Chemistry ==
=== Synonyms ===
[1α,4(S),6β,14α,16β]-20-Ethyl-1,6,14,16-tetramethoxy-4-[[[2-(3-methyl-2,5-dioxo-1-pyrrolidinyl)benzoyl]oxy]methyl]aconitane-7,8-diol; also referred to, incorrectly, as "N-methyl lycaconitine" in a few publications.

=== Physico-chemical properties ===
MLA is soluble in chloroform, but does not dissolve well in water. The free base of MLA has not been obtained in crystalline form, and in its amorphous form it melts ultimately at 128 °C; the hydriodide salt has a melting point of 201 °C.; the perchlorate salt melts at 195 °C The citrate salt is the most common form in which MLA is currently available commercially.

A pK_{a} does not seem to have been recorded for MLA, but it is considered to be a weak base because it can be readily extracted into diethyl ether from an aqueous solution at pH 7.5-8.

The optical rotation of the free base, [α]_{D} was found to be +49° in alcohol.

=== Molecular structure ===
Although commonly referred to as a "diterpenoid" alkaloid, MLA is, strictly speaking, a nor-diterpenoid, since its carbon skeleton only contains 19 C atoms, one having been deleted somewhere during its biosynthesis. Otherwise, the MLA molecule comprises a tertiary amine, two tertiary alcohols, four methyl ether groups, and a complex ester based on anthranilic acid and methylsuccinic acid. This N-(2-carboxyphenyl)-methylsuccinamido-ester is quite rare amongst natural products.

=== Synthesis ===
As of April, 2012 no total synthesis of MLA has been reported. A semi-synthesis of MLA, starting from its "parent" amino-alcohol, lycoctonine (obtained by simple alkaline hydrolysis of natural MLA) was reported in 1994.

== Pharmacology ==
In many respects, the pharmacology of MLA closely resembles that of the classical neuromuscular blocker, d-tubocurarine. The "curare-like" properties of MLA seem to have been first mentioned in 1958 by Kuzovkov and Bocharnikova, working at the Ordzhonikidze All-Union Institute for Scientific Research in Pharmaceutical Chemistry, in the former USSR. A detailed paper on the pharmacology of MLA (in the form of its hydriodide salt, given the drug name "mellictine") in classical animal preparations was published from the same Institute in the following year by Dozortseva.

They revealed that MLA blocked neuromuscular transmission in skeletal muscle, but not smooth muscle, and had some ganglion-blocking action. Such properties are characteristic of an antagonist of acetylcholine exerting its effects at nicotinic, but not muscarinic sites.

In the rat phrenic nerve-diaphragm preparation, for example, a 2 × 10^{−5}M concentration of MLA produced a 50% decrease in response, and total inhibition was caused by a 3 × 10^{−5}M concentration of the drug. In this preparation, MLA-treated muscle responded normally to direct electrical stimulation, but the inhibition of contractions was only partially antagonized by physostigmine. Similar results were obtained with frog nerve-muscle preparations, in which it was shown that MLA blocked response of the gastrocnemius muscle to electrical stimulation of the sciatic nerve, inhibited post-synaptic action potentials in the sartorius muscle elicited by stimulation of the sciatic nerve, and reduced the amplitude of miniature end-plate potentials in the extensor digitus IV muscle.

Ganglion-blocking effects of MLA were observed using the cat nictitating membrane preparation: complete inhibition of the response was produced by 4 mg/kg of "mellictine" given intravenously.

No significant effects were produced by the drug in smooth muscle preparations from rabbit, guinea pig or cat, indicating the lack of activity at typically muscarinic sites. In electrically stimulated guinea pig ileum, for example, contractions were unaffected by a concentration of 5 × 10^{−4}M of MLA.

A more detailed summary of the above data, together with much related material, may be found in a review written by Kip Panter and collaborators at USDA-ARS laboratories in Utah and California.

A significant advance was made towards understanding the pharmacology of MLA when Jennings and co-workers at the American Cyanamid Company reported that MLA (as its citrate salt) strongly inhibited the binding of tritiated propionyl-α-bungarotoxin to a receptor preparation from house-fly heads, with a K_{i} of ~ 2.5 × 10^{−10}M. Subsequently, Macallan and his co-workers showed that MLA also competed with ^{125}I-α-bungarotoxin (K_{i} ~1 × 10^{−9}M) and tritiated (−)-nicotine (K_{i} ~4 × 10^{−6}M) in a receptor preparation from rat brain. These workers also reported that MLA displaced^{125}I-α-bungarotoxin from purified Torpedo (electric ray) nicotinic acetylcholine receptors (nAChRs) with a K_{i} ~1 × 10^{−6}M. Similar experiments performed later by Ward et al. showed that MLA bound to nAChRs extracted from human muscle with a K_{i} of ~8 × 10^{−6}M; it was also reported that MLA, at a concentration of 10^{−4}M, had no affinity for muscarinic AChRs, as labeled by tritiated quinuclidinyl benzilate, from rat brain.

Further details about the binding of MLA to nAChRs were presented by Wonnacott and her co-workers, who provided evidence that MLA bound preferentially to different sub-units, as expressed in Xenopus frog oocytes, of the nAChR cloned from avian DNA: MLA was found to have an IC_{50} of ~8 × 10^{−8}M at α3β2 and ~7 × 10^{−7}M at α4β2 receptor sub-types. Although it was also established that MLA bound strongly to α7 sub-types, experimental difficulties precluded the determination of an IC_{50}. MLA displaced ^{125}I-α-bungarotoxin from α7 receptors cloned from the human K28 cell line, with a K_{i} of ~ 1 × 10^{−8}.

One milestone in the ongoing saga of MLA pharmacology (there are, as of April 2012, approximately 660 references to articles in journals covered by PubMed) to be mentioned is the characterization of the receptor-interactions of tritium-labeled MLA.

The crystal structure has been determined of a complex between MLA and an AChBP isolated from the salt-water snail, Aplysia californica.

== Toxicology ==
The toxicology of MLA has been studied largely in the context of livestock poisoning by wild larkspurs. The seminal work by John Jacyno and Mike Benn at the University of Calgary in Canada showed that MLA was most likely to be the agent responsible for the toxicity of a local larkspur, D. brownii, and provided some preliminary acute toxicity data in several animal species. These LD_{50}s are as follows: mouse, 3–5 mg/kg; frog, 3–4 mg/kg; rabbit, 2–3 mg/kg (after parenteral administration). Cats appeared to have comparable susceptibility to rabbits, whereas dogs were about one-and-a-half times more sensitive. These early observations have been comprehensively extended, The LD_{50} of MLA is estimated to be ~10 mg/kg in sheep, ~ 5 mg/kg in rats, and ~2 mg/kg in cattle.

Although most LD_{50}s are usually determined from parenteral administration of the test drug, MLA is also active when taken orally.

Signs of toxicity in calves, sheep, rats and mice, at low doses, included agitation, respiratory difficulty, and loss of motor control; symptoms appeared within 2–3 minutes of injection, and disappeared within 10 minutes. Doses large enough to produce collapse also caused an increase in heart and respiration rates, as well as tremor, with significant convulsions evident in mice and rats, but not in cattle or sheep. In cases where death seemed imminent, the poisoning in sheep could be counteracted by the i.v. administration of neostigmine and atropine, whereas poisoning in calves was reversed by the administration of physostigmine. In animals that were allowed to die, death appeared to be the result of complete motor paralysis and respiratory arrest.

It is worth noting that although a LD_{50} for man is not available, the clinical studies of Kabelyanskaya showed that an oral dose of 0.02 g of MLA hydriodide ("mellictine") might be given to patients up to 5 times per day, over the course of 1 month. However, some subjects could only tolerate single doses of 0.02 g per day without experiencing side-effects.

== Structure-Activity relationships ==
The earliest observation on a relationship between the molecular structure of MLA and a biological activity concerned the effect of the C-18 ester group on acute toxicity. When this group was hydrolyzed, the resulting amino-alcohol (named lycoctonine as a consequence of its natural occurrence) was found to be much less poisonous to animals than was MLA. Lycoctonine is more than 100x less toxic than MLA. In other functional pharmacological assays, lycoctonine resembled MLA qualitatively but was roughly ten times less potent.

When compared in nAChR-binding studies, MLA was found to compete for ^{125}I-α-bungarotoxin binding sites (i.e. α7 sub-types) over 1000x more strongly than did lycoctonine.

If the succinimide ring is deleted so as to leave only the -NH_{2} group attached to the benzene ring (as in the alkaloid anthranoyllycoctonine, which also occurs naturally), the resulting compound is intermediate between MLA and lycoctonine in potency and toxicity: it is less acutely toxic than MLA by a factor of about 4, but its affinity for ^{125}I-α-bungarotoxin binding sites is over 200x lower than that of MLA.

If the -NH_{2} group of anthranoyllycoctonine is removed, giving the compound lycoctonine-18-O-benzoate, the affinity for α7 receptors, as well as for α4β2 receptors is reduced by about a factor of 10 in comparison to MLA. When compared with MLA in the rat phrenic nerve-diaphragm assay, lycoctonine-18-O-benzoate was also about 10x less potent, and a similar reduction in potency was observed in an electrophysiological study involving frog extensor muscle.

Even the absence of the methyl group from the methylsuccinimido- ring, as in the alkaloid lycaconitine, reduces the affinity for α7 receptors by a factor of about 20, but in this case affinity for α4β2 receptors is not significantly changed in comparison with MLA.

Another approach that has been explored in the attempt to elucidate structure-activity relationships in MLA has been to start with 2-(methylsuccinimido)-benzoic acid (the carboxylic acid produced when MLA is split at the C-18 ester group) and to esterify it with various alcohols and amino-alcohols that might be considered as "molecular fragments" of MLA. None of these compounds showed any significant degree of the biological actions characteristic of MLA, however, in the limited number of assays to which they were subjected.

== Therapeutic applications ==
MLA has been used for treating a variety of neurological disorders, although there are no references to such use in the last few decades.

MLA might be useful in reducing nicotine reward without precipitating symptoms of nicotine withdrawal. This suggestion was made on the basis of experiments in which intraperitoneal doses of ~4 mg/kg and 8 mg/kg of MLA significantly reduced nicotine self-administration in rats.

It has been suggested that MLA had potential in the treatment of cannabis dependence. However, this suggestion was apparently based only on work by Solinas et al. who showed that doses of 0.3-5.6 mg/kg, i.p., in rats, dose-dependently antagonized the discriminative-stimulus effects of 3 mg/kg THC.

Given that the early Soviet work with "mellictine" indicated that as little as ~0.2-0.3 mg/kg, orally, in man (assuming a weight of 60–70 kg, for the sake of making the dose conversion) could produce symptoms of toxicity, and that oral administration of most drugs typically requires more drug than parenteral administration, it is uncertain if MLA will prove to be a practical treatment for either nicotine or cannabis addiction, based on the effective doses required in the rat experiments.

== Insecticidal action ==
Jennings and co-workers, in addition to making their key observations (see Pharmacology above) about the receptor-binding of MLA, found it to be toxic (50+% mortality) to the following insect species: Empoasca abrupta (at 100 ppm), Heliothis virescens (at 1000 ppm), Musca domestica (at 1000 ppm) and Spodoptera eridana (at 1000 ppm). Species which were not significantly affected by MLA were: Anopheles quadrimaculatus, Aphis fabae, Diabrotica undecimpunctuata howardi and Tetranychus urticae. MLA also behaved as a feeding deterrent, with an LC_{50} of ~300 ppm, to Spodoptera larvae feeding on bean leaves.
