= Euphorbia condylocarpa =

Scientific classification
- Kingdom: Plantae
- Clade: Tracheophytes
- Clade: Angiosperms
- Clade: Eudicots
- Clade: Rosids
- Order: Malpighiales
- Family: Euphorbiaceae
- Genus: Euphorbia
- Species: E. condylocarpa

Binomial name
- Euphorbia condylocarpa M.Bieb.

Species of flowering plant

Euphorbia condylocarpa is a plant species in the genus Euphorbia.

== Description ==
Medium (10–35 cm) hairless perennial, leaves strongly eared at the base, obtuse to subacute at the tip, margins serrate or toothless, stalks 0 or short. The capsules are relatively large (4–5.5(6) mm) rather spherical with low wide warts on the three lobes. Seeds 3-3.5 mm, smooth, dark brown, with yellowish 0.5 mm appendage. Mar-Jun (Turkey) Apr-May (Iran). The eastern forms have rather dense heads of flowers and more discernably-toothed leaves, but the Turkish forms are more open and effusely flowered with obscure leaf teeth and were originally distinguished as E. cardiophylla Boiss. & Heldr. but now merged into E. condylocarpa. ( mostly, and &.)

Similar species include E. apios (leaves uneared), E. dimorphocaulon (flowering stems autumn, c. leafless, vegetative stems spring), E. platyphyllos (annual to 1m, often hairy, fruit 2.5–3 mm).

== Habitat ==
Turkey: Open Pinus forest, Abies cilicica forest, Quercus scrub, rocky slopes, screes, steppe, field margins, 20–2100 m.

Iran: Mountain slopes, oak forests, meadows, rocky slopes and steppe forests on limestone, at 1500–2500 m.

== Range ==
Iran, Iraq, North Caucasus, Transcaucasus, Turkey (PoWo Map).

== Phytochemistry ==
The plant contains the flavonol trifolin.

== See also ==
- List of Euphorbia species
