= Kaempferol 3-O-galactosyltransferase =

Class of enzymes

Identifiers
- EC no.: 2.4.1.234

Databases
- IntEnz: IntEnz view
- BRENDA: BRENDA entry
- ExPASy: NiceZyme view
- KEGG: KEGG entry
- MetaCyc: metabolic pathway
- PRIAM: profile
- PDB structures: RCSB PDB PDBe PDBsum
Search
- PMC: articles
- PubMed: articles
- NCBI: proteins

Kaempferol 3-O-galactosyltransferase (EC 2.4.1.234) is an enzyme that catalyzes the chemical reaction

kaempferol
+ UDP-galactose
trifolin
+ UDP

The two substrates of this enzyme characterised from Petunia hybrida and seedlings of Vigna mungo are the flavonol, kaempferol, and UDP-galactose. Its products are trifolin and uridine diphosphate (UDP)..

This enzyme belongs to the family of glycosyltransferases, specifically the hexosyltransferases. The systematic name of this enzyme class is UDP-galactose:kaempferol 3-O-beta-D-galactosyltransferase. This enzyme is also called F3GalTase. It can act on other flavonols including quercetin, myricetin, and fisetin. It can also convert the galactoside derivatives back to their parent compounds.
