= Consolida oliveriana =

Scientific classification
- Kingdom: Plantae
- Clade: Tracheophytes
- Clade: Angiosperms
- Clade: Eudicots
- Order: Ranunculales
- Family: Ranunculaceae
- Genus: Consolida
- Species: C. oliveriana

Binomial name
- Consolida oliveriana (DC.) Schrödinger

Synonyms
- Delphinium oliverianum DC. (basionym)

Species of flowering plant

Consolida oliveriana is a plant species in the genus Consolida. The plant is native to Iran, Iraq, and Turkey.

== Uses ==
Consolida oliveriana contains the flavonol chemical compound trifolin.
