= Trifolin =

- Trifolin structure

Names
- IUPAC name 3-(β-D-Galactopyranosyloxy)-4′,5,7-trihydroxyflavone
- Systematic IUPAC name 5,7-Dihydroxy-2-(4-hydroxyphenyl)-3-{[(2S,3R,4S,5R,6R)-3,4,5-trihydroxy-6-(hydroxymethyl)oxan-2-yl]oxy}-4H-1-benzopyran-4-one
- Other names Kaempferol 3-O-β-D-galactoside; Kaempferol-3-O-galactoside

Identifiers
CAS Number	23627-87-4
3D model (JSmol)	Interactive image
ChEBI	CHEBI:31742
ChemSpider	10306173
KEGG	C12626
PubChem CID	5282149
UNII	7CKD5ET5SP
CompTox Dashboard (EPA)	DTXSID30946447
- InChI: InChI=1S/C21H20O11/c22-7-13-15(26)17(28)18(29)21(31-13)32-20-16(27)14-11(25)5-10(24)6-12(14)30-19(20)8-1-3-9(23)4-2-8/h1-6,13,15,17-18,21-26,28-29H,7H2/t13-,15+,17+,18-,21+/m1/s1 Key: JPUKWEQWGBDDQB-DTGCRPNFSA-N
- SMILES: C1=CC(=CC=C1C2=C(C(=O)C3=C(C=C(C=C3O2)O)O)OC4C(C(C(C(O4)CO)O)O)O)O

Properties
Chemical formula	C_{21}H_{20}O_{11}
Molar mass	448.37 g/mol
Density	1.791 g/mL
- Except where otherwise noted, data are given for materials in their standard state (at 25 °C [77 °F], 100 kPa). Infobox references

Trifolin is a chemical compound. It is the kaempferol 3-galactoside. It can be found in Camptotheca acuminata, in Euphorbia condylocarpa or in Consolida oliveriana.

== Biosynthesis ==
Kaempferol 3-O-galactosyltransferase is an enzyme characterised from Petunia hybrida that catalyzes a reversible chemical reaction that forms a galactoside. The enzyme can also be found in seedlings of Vigna mungo.

kaempferol
+ UDP-galactose
trifolin
+ UDP
