= Delsoline =

Naturally occurring chemical compound

Delcosine (R = H)
- Delsoline (R = CH_{3})

Names
- IUPAC name (1α,6β,14α,16β)-20-Ethyl-6,16-dimethoxy-4-(methoxymethyl)aconitane-1,7,8,14-tetrol

Identifiers
- Compounds; R = H: Delcosine; R = CH_{3}: Delsoline
| CAS Number | R = H: 545-56-2; R = CH_{3}: 509-18-2 |
| 3D model (JSmol) | R = CH_{3}: Interactive image |
| ChemSpider | R = H: 58804922; R = CH_{3}: 22875325 |
| PubChem CID | R = H: 441725; R = CH_{3}: 71454486 |
| UNII | R = H: 8NCS5NCP4W |
- InChI: R = H: InChI=1S/C24H39NO7/c1-5-25-10-21(11-30-2)7-6-15(26)23-13-8-12-14(31-3)9-22(28,16(13)17(12)27)24(29,20(23)25)19(32-4)18(21)23/h12-20,26-29H,5-11H2,1-4H3/t12-,13-,14+,15+,16-,17+,18-,19+,20+,21+,22-,23+,24-/m1/s1 Key: BMZNJVXOLCBDPZ-FCXNFKKQSA-N; R = CH_{3}: InChI=1S/C25H41NO7/c1-6-26-11-22(12-30-2)8-7-16(27)24-14-9-13-15(31-3)10-23(28,17(14)18(13)32-4)25(29,21(24)26)20(33-5)19(22)24/h13-21,27-29H,6-12H2,1-5H3/t13-,14-,15+,16+,17-,18+,19-,20+,21+,22+,23-,24+,25-/m1/s1 Key: JVBLTQQBEQQLEV-DIZROUMASA-N
- SMILES: R = CH_{3}: CC[N@]1C[C@@]2(CC[C@@H]([C@@]34[C@@H]2[C@@H](C([C@H]31)([C@]5(C[C@@H]([C@H]6C[C@@H]4[C@@H]5[C@H]6OC)OC)O)O)OC)O)COC

Properties
| Chemical formula | C_{25}H_{41}NO_{7} |
| Molar mass | 467.603 g·mol^{−1} |
- Except where otherwise noted, data are given for materials in their standard state (at 25 °C [77 °F], 100 kPa). Infobox references

Delsoline and delcosine are two closely related naturally occurring diterpene alkaloids first isolated from Delphinium consolida. They occur widely in the Ranunculaceae plant family. The polycyclic ring system containing nineteen carbon atoms and one nitrogen atom in these compounds is the same as in aconitine and this is reflected in their preferred IUPAC name.

== History ==
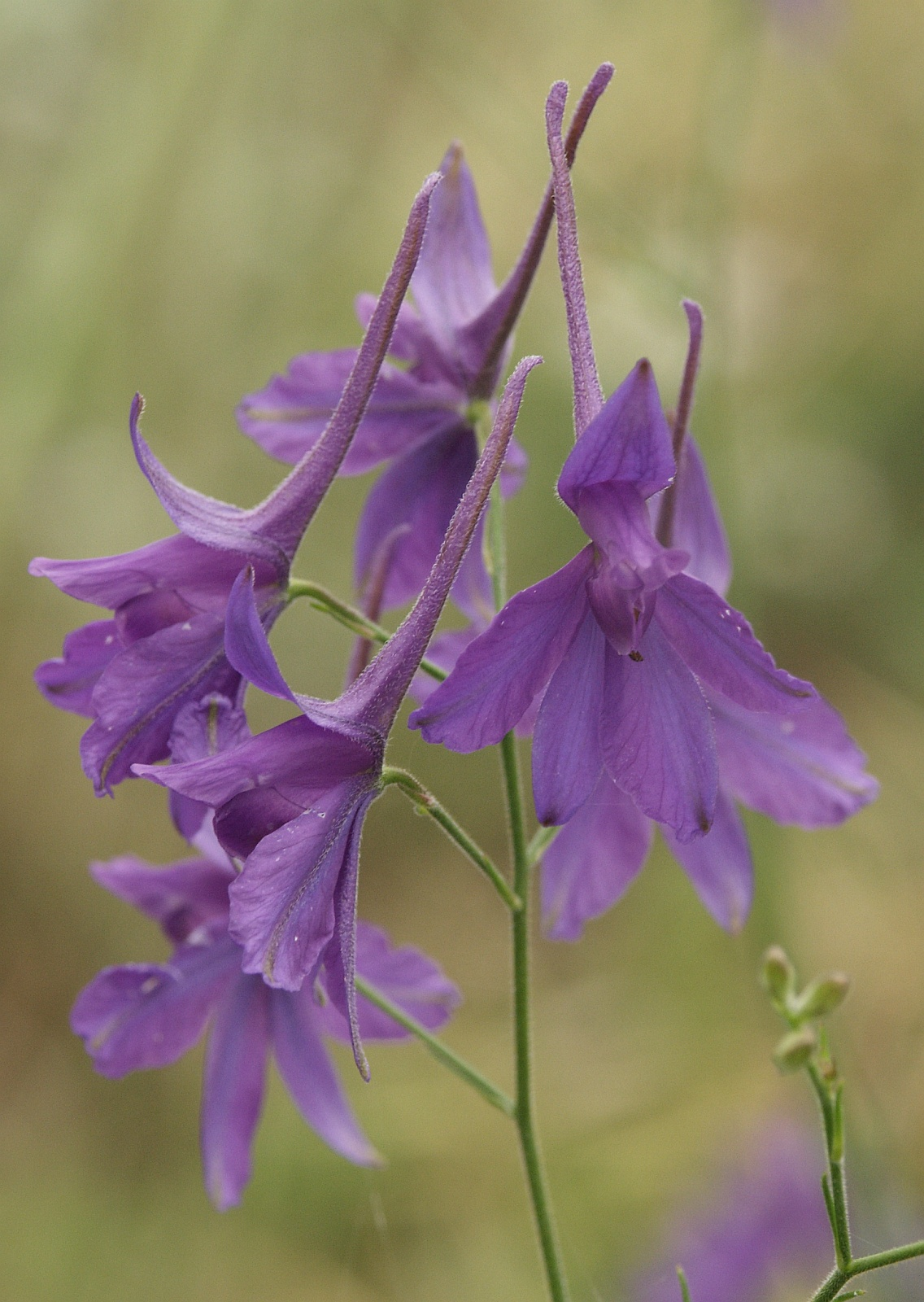
Delsoline and delcosine were first isolated from Delphinium consolida

Delsoline and delcosine were named in 1924 by Markwood, who isolated these alkaloids from Delphinium consolida, but their structures were in doubt until established in 1963 and later confirmed by the X-ray crystallography of delsoline. There are many other known diterpene alkaloids, some of which differ from these in only minor ways. Thus while delsoline (R=CH_{3}) is a methylated derivative of delcosine (R=H), it is also an isomeric methyl derivative of gigactonine.

== Synthesis ==
Although individual members of this class of alkaloids have been extensively studied, their chemical complexity has limited the number which have been individually synthesised. Similarly, their full biosynthetic pathway is only known in outline in most cases.

== Natural occurrence ==
The compounds co-occur in Aconitum variegatum and many species of Delphinium including Delphinium ajacis and other Consolida species in the Ranunculaceae plant family.

== Biochemistry ==
Compounds related to aconitine are widely studied for their properties in biological systems and these have been reviewed. For example, delsoline has been reported be one of the active components in traditional Chinese medicinal plants.

== See also ==
- Aconitine
