= Consolida armeniaca =

Scientific classification
- Kingdom: Plantae
- Clade: Embryophytes
- Clade: Tracheophytes
- Clade: Angiosperms
- Clade: Eudicots
- Order: Ranunculales
- Family: Ranunculaceae
- Genus: Consolida
- Species: C. armeniaca

Binomial name
- Consolida armeniaca (Stapf ex Huth) F.C.Schrad.

Species of flowering plant

Consolida armeniaca is an annual flowering plant of the family Ranunculaceae. The name is a synonym of Delphinium armeniacum Stapf ex Huth
