= Gigactonine =

Names
- IUPAC name (1α,6β,14α,16β)-20-Ethyl-4-(hydroxymethyl)-6,14,16-trimethoxyaconitane-1,7,8-triol

Identifiers
CAS Number	65967-20-6
3D model (JSmol)	Interactive image
ChemSpider	10197073
PubChem CID	181763
CompTox Dashboard (EPA)	DTXSID50984447
- InChI: InChI=1S/C24H39NO7/c1-5-25-10-21(11-26)7-6-15(27)23-13-8-12-14(30-2)9-22(28,16(13)17(12)31-3)24(29,20(23)25)19(32-4)18(21)23/h12-20,26-29H,5-11H2,1-4H3/t12-,13-,14+,15+,16-,17+,18-,19+,20+,21+,22-,23+,24+/m1/s1 Key: DKODPYKVVJKLFU-YRYTXJGESA-N
- SMILES: CCN1C[C@@]2(CC[C@@H]([C@@]34[C@@H]2[C@@H]([C@@](C31)([C@]5(C[C@@H]([C@H]6C[C@@H]4[C@@H]5[C@H]6OC)OC)O)O)OC)O)CO

Properties
Chemical formula	C_{24}H_{39}NO_{7}
Molar mass	453.576 g·mol^{−1}
Melting point	168 °C (334 °F; 441 K)
- Except where otherwise noted, data are given for materials in their standard state (at 25 °C [77 °F], 100 kPa). Infobox references

Gigactonine is a naturally occurring diterpene alkaloid first isolated from Aconitum gigas. It occurs widely in the Ranunculaceae plant family. The polycyclic ring system of this chemical compound contains nineteen carbon atoms and one nitrogen atom, which is the same as in aconitine and this is reflected in its preferred IUPAC name.

== History ==
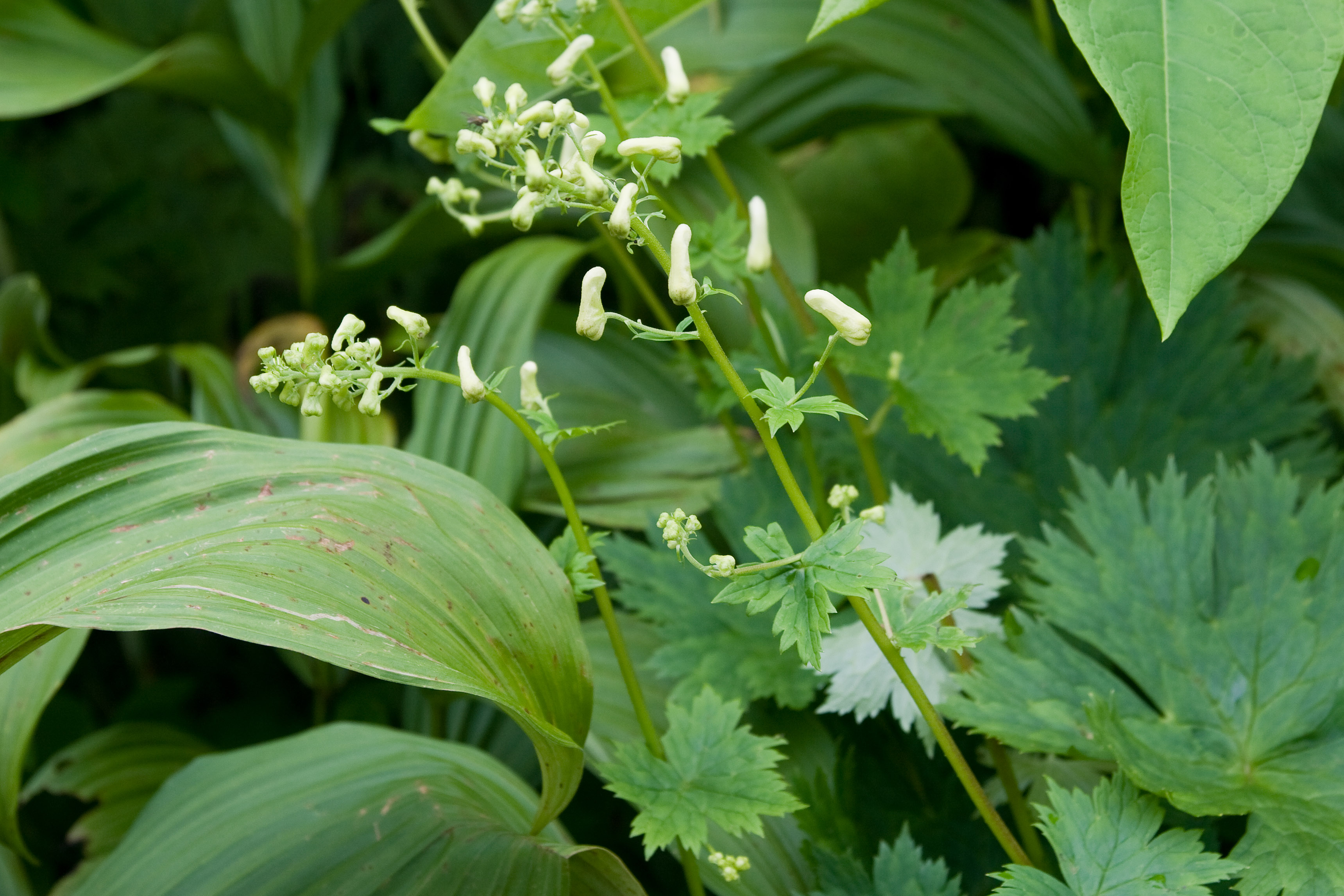
Aconitum gigas, from which gigactonine was first isolated

Gigactonine was reported in 1978 after its isolation from Aconitum gigas. Although a novel structure at that time, it was recognised to be related to known diterpene alkaloids including delsoline, which is methylated on its 4-hydroxymethyl primary alcohol sidechain.

== Synthesis ==
Although individual members of this class of alkaloids have been extensively studied, their chemical complexity has limited the number which have been individually synthesised. Similarly, their full biosynthetic pathway is only known in outline in most cases.

== Natural occurrence ==
Gigactonine has been reported as the main alkaloid in the flowers of Aconitum lycoctonum and has been isolated from Delphinium including Delphinium ajacis and other Consolida species in the Ranunculaceae plant family.

== Biochemistry ==
Compounds related to aconitine are widely studied for their properties in biological systems and these have been reviewed. For example, gigactonine has been reported to have hERG-inhibiting activity.
