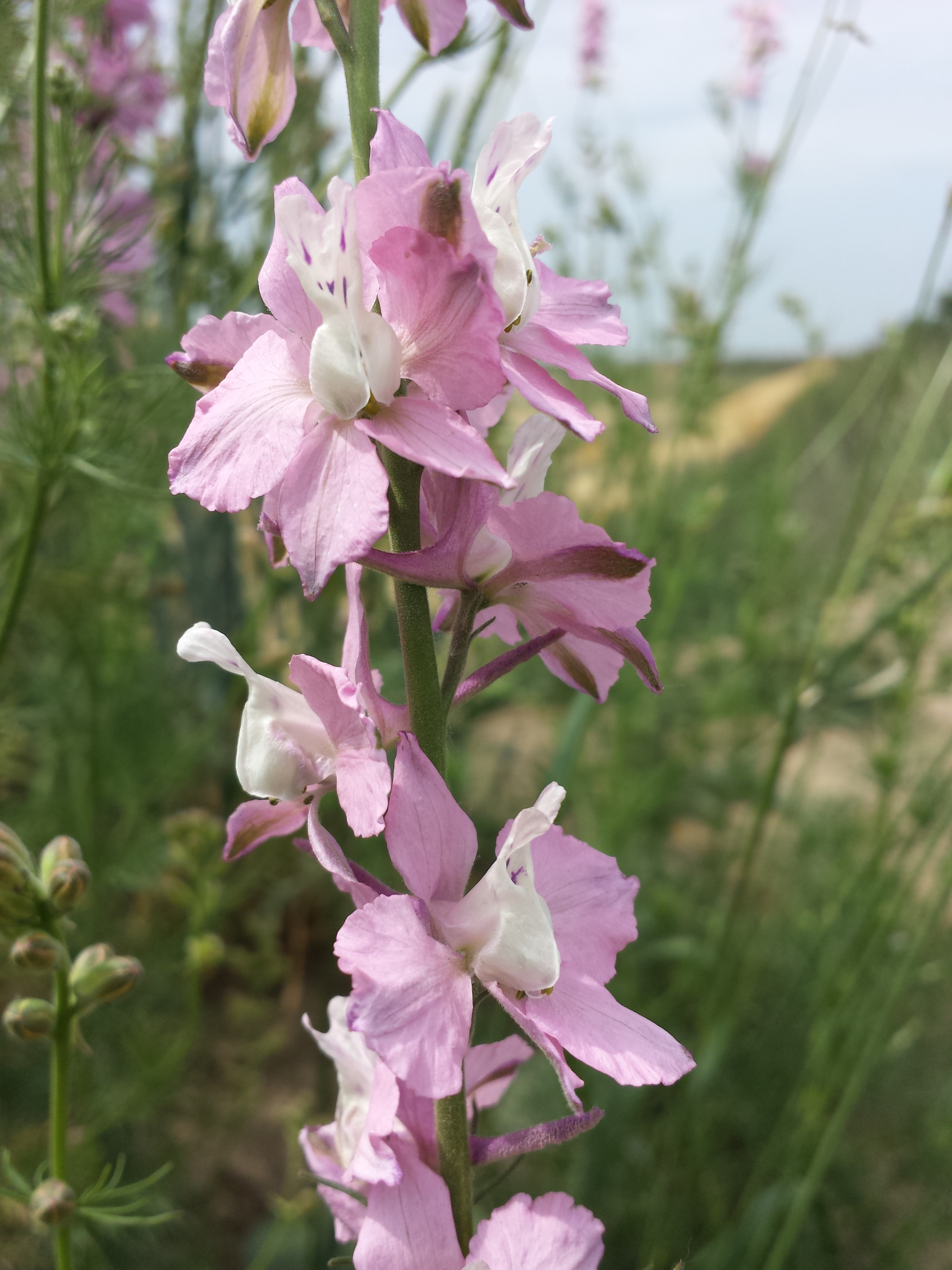
- Consolida ajacis

Scientific classification
- Kingdom: Plantae
- Clade: Tracheophytes
- Clade: Angiosperms
- Clade: Eudicots
- Order: Ranunculales
- Family: Ranunculaceae
- Subfamily: Ranunculoideae
- Tribe: Delphinieae
- Genus: Consolida; Gray

= Consolida =

Genus of flowering plants

Consolida is a genus of about 40 species of annual flowering plants in the family Ranunculaceae, native to western Europe, the Mediterranean and Asia. Phylogenetic studies show that Consolida is actually an annual clade nested within the genus Delphinium and it has been treated as a synonym of Delphinium in Kew's Plants of the World Online. The name of the genus comes from an archaic use of consolidation, meaning "healing", in reference to the plant's medieval use for healing wounds.

Consolida differs from other species of Delphinium (mostly perennials) in the flower structure, with only one united petal, rather than the four separate petals (or more in cultivars) found in other delphiniums, and in the fruit, which comprises a single follicle, instead of a cluster of three to five together.

It is a popular garden plant and cut flower, grown from seed every year, with numerous cultivars in shades of pink, blue, purple and white. In seed catalogues it is usually labelled as larkspur, a common name referring to the shape of the spurred calyx, with "delphinium" reserved for its perennial relatives.

== Species ==
There are more than 50 species in Consolida:

- Consolida aconiti (syn. Delphinium aconiti)
- Consolida ajacis (syn. Consolida ambigua; Consolida baluchistanica; Delphinium ajacis) — rocket larkspur: Europe, Cyprus, Turkey
- Consolida anthoroidea (syn. Delphinium anthoroideum)
- Consolida arenaria (syn. Delphinium arenarium)
- Consolida armeniaca (syn. Delphinium armeniacum)
- Consolida aucheri (syn. Delphinium aucheri)
- Consolida axilliflora (syn. Delphinium axilliflorum)
- Consolida barbata (syn. Delphinium barbatum)
- Consolida brevicornis (syn. Delphinium brevicorne)
- Consolida camptocarpa (syn. Delphinium camptocarpum) — Afghanistan, Turkmenistan, Pakistan
- Consolida coelesyriaca (syn. Delphinium coelesyriacum)
- Consolida cornuta (syn. Delphinium cornutum)
- Consolida cruciata (syn. Delphinium cruciatum)
- Consolida deserti-syriaci (syn. Delphinium deserti-syriaci)
- Consolida flava (syn. Delphinium flavum)
- Consolida glandulosa (syn. Delphinium glandulosum)
- Consolida gombaultii (syn. Delphinium gombaultii)
- Consolida hellespontica (syn. Delphinium hellesponticum)
- Consolida hohenackeri (syn. Delphinium hohenackeri)
- Consolida incana (syn. Delphinium incanum)
- Consolida kabuliana (syn. Delphinium kabulianum)
- Consolida kandaharica (syn. Delphinium kandaharicum)
- Consolida leptocarpa (syn. Delphinium leptocarpum)
- Consolida linarioides (syn. Delphinium linarioides)
- Consolida lineolata (syn. Delphinium lineolatum)
- Consolida lorestanica (syn. Delphinium lorestanicum)
- Consolida mauritanica (syn. Delphinium mauritanicum)
- Consolida oligantha (syn. Delphinium oliganthum)
- Consolida oliveriana (syn. Delphinium oliverianum) — Iran, Iraq, Turkey
- Consolida olopetala (syn. Delphinium olopetalum)
- Consolida orientalis (syn. Delphinium hispanicum) — eastern larkspur: North Africa, Europe
- Consolida persica (syn. Consolida halophila; Delphinium persicum)
- Consolida phrygia (syn. Delphinium phrygium)
- Consolida pubescens (syn. Delphinium pubescens) — North Africa, Europe
- Consolida pusilla (syn. Consolida pygmaea; Delphinium pusillum)
- Consolida raveyi (syn. Delphinium raveyi)
- Consolida regalis (syn. Delphinium consolida) — field larkspur: Western Asia, Europe
  - C. r. subsp. divaricata (syn. Consolida divaricata)
  - C. r. subsp. paniculata
  - C. r. subsp. regalis
- Consolida rugulosa (syn. Delphinium rugulosum) — Western Asia, Central Asia
- Consolida saccata (syn. Delphinium saccatum)
- Consolida samia (syn. Delphinium samium)
- Consolida schlagintweitii (syn. Delphinium schlagintweitii)
- Consolida scleroclada (syn. Delphinium sclerocladum)
- Consolida staminosa (syn. Delphinium staminosum)
- Consolida stapfiana (syn. Delphinium stapfianum)
- Consolida stenocarpa (syn. Delphinium stenocarpum)
- Consolida stocksiana (syn. Delphinium stocksianum)
- Consolida sulphurea (syn. Delphinium sulphureum) — Turkey
- Consolida teheranica (syn. Delphinium teheranicum)
- Consolida tenuissima (syn. Delphinium tenuissimum)
- Consolida thirkeana (syn. Delphinium thirkeanum)
- Consolida tomentosa (syn. Delphinium tomentosum)
- Consolida trigonelloides (syn. Delphinium trigonelloides)
- Consolida tuntasiana (syn. Delphinium tuntasianum)
- Consolida uechtritziana (syn. Delphinium uechtritzianum)

== Toxicity ==
All parts of the plant are toxic to humans, especially the seeds.
