= Lycoctonine =

Identifiers
CAS Number	26000-17-9
3D model (JSmol)	Interactive image
ChEMBL	ChEMBL517003
ChemSpider	10145862
PubChem CID	11972492
UNII	0GLX1UNC80
CompTox Dashboard (EPA)	DTXSID10948904
- InChI: InChI=1S/C25H41NO7/c1-6-26-11-22(12-27)8-7-16(31-3)24-14-9-13-15(30-2)10-23(28,17(14)18(13)32-4)25(29,21(24)26)20(33-5)19(22)24/h13-21,27-29H,6-12H2,1-5H3/t13-,14-,15+,16+,17-,18+,19-,20+,21+,22+,23-,24+,25+/m1/s1 Key: YOTUXHIWBVZAJQ-VCDUNCIKSA-N
- SMILES: CCN1C[C@@]2(CC[C@@H]([C@@]34[C@@H]2[C@@H]([C@]([C@H]31)([C@]5(C[C@@H]([C@H]6C[C@@H]4[C@@H]5[C@H]6OC)OC)O)O)OC)OC)CO

Properties
Chemical formula	C_{25}H_{41}NO_{7}
Molar mass	467.603 g·mol^{−1}
- Except where otherwise noted, data are given for materials in their standard state (at 25 °C [77 °F], 100 kPa). Infobox references

Lycoctonine is a plant alkaloid and a precursor to the ABC ring system of taxoids. Distinguish from lycaconitine, which is the N-succinimido-benzoic-ester.
